

359001–359100 

|-bgcolor=#C2FFFF
| 359001 ||  || — || August 10, 2007 || Kitt Peak || Spacewatch || L4 || align=right | 10 km || 
|-id=002 bgcolor=#fefefe
| 359002 ||  || — || October 8, 2008 || Mount Lemmon || Mount Lemmon Survey || — || align=right | 1.6 km || 
|-id=003 bgcolor=#FA8072
| 359003 ||  || — || October 25, 2008 || Sierra Stars || F. Tozzi || — || align=right | 1.3 km || 
|-id=004 bgcolor=#C2FFFF
| 359004 ||  || — || October 9, 2008 || Mount Lemmon || Mount Lemmon Survey || L4 || align=right | 7.5 km || 
|-id=005 bgcolor=#fefefe
| 359005 ||  || — || October 20, 2008 || Mount Lemmon || Mount Lemmon Survey || FLO || align=right data-sort-value="0.61" | 610 m || 
|-id=006 bgcolor=#fefefe
| 359006 ||  || — || October 23, 2008 || Kitt Peak || Spacewatch || FLO || align=right data-sort-value="0.69" | 690 m || 
|-id=007 bgcolor=#fefefe
| 359007 ||  || — || October 22, 2008 || Kitt Peak || Spacewatch || — || align=right data-sort-value="0.81" | 810 m || 
|-id=008 bgcolor=#fefefe
| 359008 ||  || — || October 24, 2008 || Kitt Peak || Spacewatch || — || align=right data-sort-value="0.77" | 770 m || 
|-id=009 bgcolor=#fefefe
| 359009 ||  || — || October 24, 2008 || Kitt Peak || Spacewatch || — || align=right data-sort-value="0.68" | 680 m || 
|-id=010 bgcolor=#fefefe
| 359010 ||  || — || September 7, 2008 || Mount Lemmon || Mount Lemmon Survey || FLO || align=right data-sort-value="0.60" | 600 m || 
|-id=011 bgcolor=#C2FFFF
| 359011 ||  || — || October 22, 2008 || Kitt Peak || Spacewatch || L4 || align=right | 7.5 km || 
|-id=012 bgcolor=#fefefe
| 359012 ||  || — || October 24, 2008 || Catalina || CSS || FLO || align=right data-sort-value="0.58" | 580 m || 
|-id=013 bgcolor=#fefefe
| 359013 ||  || — || October 27, 2008 || Kitt Peak || Spacewatch || — || align=right data-sort-value="0.68" | 680 m || 
|-id=014 bgcolor=#fefefe
| 359014 ||  || — || October 27, 2008 || Kitt Peak || Spacewatch || FLO || align=right data-sort-value="0.64" | 640 m || 
|-id=015 bgcolor=#fefefe
| 359015 ||  || — || October 28, 2008 || Kitt Peak || Spacewatch || — || align=right data-sort-value="0.78" | 780 m || 
|-id=016 bgcolor=#fefefe
| 359016 ||  || — || October 28, 2008 || Mount Lemmon || Mount Lemmon Survey || FLO || align=right data-sort-value="0.64" | 640 m || 
|-id=017 bgcolor=#fefefe
| 359017 ||  || — || October 29, 2008 || Kitt Peak || Spacewatch || — || align=right data-sort-value="0.84" | 840 m || 
|-id=018 bgcolor=#fefefe
| 359018 ||  || — || October 29, 2008 || Kitt Peak || Spacewatch || — || align=right data-sort-value="0.76" | 760 m || 
|-id=019 bgcolor=#fefefe
| 359019 ||  || — || October 30, 2008 || Mount Lemmon || Mount Lemmon Survey || — || align=right | 1.3 km || 
|-id=020 bgcolor=#FA8072
| 359020 ||  || — || October 31, 2008 || Catalina || CSS || — || align=right data-sort-value="0.73" | 730 m || 
|-id=021 bgcolor=#E9E9E9
| 359021 ||  || — || October 31, 2008 || Catalina || CSS || — || align=right | 3.1 km || 
|-id=022 bgcolor=#fefefe
| 359022 ||  || — || December 7, 2005 || Kitt Peak || Spacewatch || — || align=right data-sort-value="0.83" | 830 m || 
|-id=023 bgcolor=#fefefe
| 359023 ||  || — || October 24, 2008 || Catalina || CSS || — || align=right data-sort-value="0.88" | 880 m || 
|-id=024 bgcolor=#fefefe
| 359024 ||  || — || October 29, 2008 || Mount Lemmon || Mount Lemmon Survey || — || align=right | 1.4 km || 
|-id=025 bgcolor=#C2FFFF
| 359025 ||  || — || November 1, 2008 || Kitt Peak || Spacewatch || L4 || align=right | 6.8 km || 
|-id=026 bgcolor=#fefefe
| 359026 ||  || — || March 24, 2006 || Kitt Peak || Spacewatch || — || align=right data-sort-value="0.83" | 830 m || 
|-id=027 bgcolor=#fefefe
| 359027 ||  || — || September 23, 2008 || Kitt Peak || Spacewatch || — || align=right data-sort-value="0.68" | 680 m || 
|-id=028 bgcolor=#fefefe
| 359028 ||  || — || November 2, 2008 || Mount Lemmon || Mount Lemmon Survey || FLO || align=right data-sort-value="0.88" | 880 m || 
|-id=029 bgcolor=#fefefe
| 359029 ||  || — || November 8, 2008 || Mount Lemmon || Mount Lemmon Survey || — || align=right | 1.2 km || 
|-id=030 bgcolor=#E9E9E9
| 359030 ||  || — || November 19, 2008 || Mount Lemmon || Mount Lemmon Survey || — || align=right | 2.7 km || 
|-id=031 bgcolor=#E9E9E9
| 359031 ||  || — || November 19, 2008 || Mount Lemmon || Mount Lemmon Survey || — || align=right | 4.9 km || 
|-id=032 bgcolor=#fefefe
| 359032 ||  || — || October 23, 2008 || Mount Lemmon || Mount Lemmon Survey || — || align=right data-sort-value="0.93" | 930 m || 
|-id=033 bgcolor=#fefefe
| 359033 ||  || — || November 20, 2008 || Socorro || LINEAR || — || align=right | 1.1 km || 
|-id=034 bgcolor=#fefefe
| 359034 ||  || — || November 18, 2008 || Kitt Peak || Spacewatch || FLO || align=right data-sort-value="0.69" | 690 m || 
|-id=035 bgcolor=#fefefe
| 359035 ||  || — || November 19, 2008 || Mount Lemmon || Mount Lemmon Survey || — || align=right | 1.1 km || 
|-id=036 bgcolor=#fefefe
| 359036 ||  || — || December 8, 2005 || Kitt Peak || Spacewatch || FLO || align=right data-sort-value="0.67" | 670 m || 
|-id=037 bgcolor=#fefefe
| 359037 ||  || — || November 23, 2008 || La Sagra || OAM Obs. || — || align=right data-sort-value="0.85" | 850 m || 
|-id=038 bgcolor=#fefefe
| 359038 ||  || — || September 29, 2008 || Mount Lemmon || Mount Lemmon Survey || — || align=right data-sort-value="0.71" | 710 m || 
|-id=039 bgcolor=#fefefe
| 359039 ||  || — || November 30, 2008 || Mount Lemmon || Mount Lemmon Survey || MAS || align=right data-sort-value="0.59" | 590 m || 
|-id=040 bgcolor=#fefefe
| 359040 ||  || — || November 30, 2008 || Kitt Peak || Spacewatch || V || align=right data-sort-value="0.62" | 620 m || 
|-id=041 bgcolor=#fefefe
| 359041 ||  || — || November 21, 2008 || Mount Lemmon || Mount Lemmon Survey || MAS || align=right data-sort-value="0.63" | 630 m || 
|-id=042 bgcolor=#fefefe
| 359042 ||  || — || September 4, 2000 || Kitt Peak || Spacewatch || — || align=right data-sort-value="0.82" | 820 m || 
|-id=043 bgcolor=#fefefe
| 359043 ||  || — || November 30, 2008 || Mount Lemmon || Mount Lemmon Survey || MAS || align=right data-sort-value="0.78" | 780 m || 
|-id=044 bgcolor=#fefefe
| 359044 ||  || — || November 22, 2008 || Kitt Peak || Spacewatch || NYS || align=right data-sort-value="0.57" | 570 m || 
|-id=045 bgcolor=#fefefe
| 359045 ||  || — || December 3, 2008 || Socorro || LINEAR || — || align=right | 1.2 km || 
|-id=046 bgcolor=#fefefe
| 359046 ||  || — || December 2, 2008 || Kitt Peak || Spacewatch || — || align=right data-sort-value="0.89" | 890 m || 
|-id=047 bgcolor=#E9E9E9
| 359047 ||  || — || November 19, 2008 || Kitt Peak || Spacewatch || — || align=right | 2.2 km || 
|-id=048 bgcolor=#fefefe
| 359048 ||  || — || November 24, 2008 || Kitt Peak || Spacewatch || — || align=right data-sort-value="0.88" | 880 m || 
|-id=049 bgcolor=#fefefe
| 359049 ||  || — || December 4, 2008 || Mount Lemmon || Mount Lemmon Survey || V || align=right data-sort-value="0.62" | 620 m || 
|-id=050 bgcolor=#fefefe
| 359050 ||  || — || December 4, 2008 || Mount Lemmon || Mount Lemmon Survey || — || align=right data-sort-value="0.98" | 980 m || 
|-id=051 bgcolor=#fefefe
| 359051 ||  || — || December 20, 2008 || Mount Lemmon || Mount Lemmon Survey || V || align=right data-sort-value="0.48" | 480 m || 
|-id=052 bgcolor=#fefefe
| 359052 ||  || — || December 21, 2008 || Mount Lemmon || Mount Lemmon Survey || — || align=right data-sort-value="0.76" | 760 m || 
|-id=053 bgcolor=#fefefe
| 359053 ||  || — || November 8, 2008 || Mount Lemmon || Mount Lemmon Survey || — || align=right | 1.00 km || 
|-id=054 bgcolor=#fefefe
| 359054 ||  || — || December 21, 2008 || Mount Lemmon || Mount Lemmon Survey || — || align=right | 1.1 km || 
|-id=055 bgcolor=#fefefe
| 359055 ||  || — || December 21, 2008 || Mount Lemmon || Mount Lemmon Survey || NYS || align=right data-sort-value="0.74" | 740 m || 
|-id=056 bgcolor=#fefefe
| 359056 ||  || — || December 26, 2008 || Bergisch Gladbach || W. Bickel || — || align=right | 1.0 km || 
|-id=057 bgcolor=#fefefe
| 359057 ||  || — || December 22, 2008 || Kitt Peak || Spacewatch || — || align=right data-sort-value="0.82" | 820 m || 
|-id=058 bgcolor=#fefefe
| 359058 ||  || — || December 26, 2008 || Bergisch Gladbac || W. Bickel || — || align=right data-sort-value="0.94" | 940 m || 
|-id=059 bgcolor=#fefefe
| 359059 ||  || — || December 29, 2008 || Mount Lemmon || Mount Lemmon Survey || V || align=right data-sort-value="0.88" | 880 m || 
|-id=060 bgcolor=#fefefe
| 359060 ||  || — || December 29, 2008 || Kitt Peak || Spacewatch || V || align=right data-sort-value="0.65" | 650 m || 
|-id=061 bgcolor=#fefefe
| 359061 ||  || — || December 30, 2008 || Mount Lemmon || Mount Lemmon Survey || — || align=right | 1.2 km || 
|-id=062 bgcolor=#fefefe
| 359062 ||  || — || December 31, 2008 || Kitt Peak || Spacewatch || — || align=right data-sort-value="0.82" | 820 m || 
|-id=063 bgcolor=#fefefe
| 359063 ||  || — || December 29, 2008 || Kitt Peak || Spacewatch || NYS || align=right data-sort-value="0.76" | 760 m || 
|-id=064 bgcolor=#fefefe
| 359064 ||  || — || February 10, 2002 || Socorro || LINEAR || MAS || align=right data-sort-value="0.74" | 740 m || 
|-id=065 bgcolor=#fefefe
| 359065 ||  || — || December 29, 2008 || Mount Lemmon || Mount Lemmon Survey || — || align=right data-sort-value="0.83" | 830 m || 
|-id=066 bgcolor=#fefefe
| 359066 ||  || — || December 29, 2008 || Kitt Peak || Spacewatch || MAS || align=right data-sort-value="0.68" | 680 m || 
|-id=067 bgcolor=#fefefe
| 359067 ||  || — || December 29, 2008 || Kitt Peak || Spacewatch || — || align=right data-sort-value="0.89" | 890 m || 
|-id=068 bgcolor=#fefefe
| 359068 ||  || — || December 29, 2008 || Kitt Peak || Spacewatch || V || align=right data-sort-value="0.80" | 800 m || 
|-id=069 bgcolor=#d6d6d6
| 359069 ||  || — || December 29, 2008 || Mount Lemmon || Mount Lemmon Survey || THM || align=right | 2.1 km || 
|-id=070 bgcolor=#fefefe
| 359070 ||  || — || December 30, 2008 || Kitt Peak || Spacewatch || NYS || align=right data-sort-value="0.59" | 590 m || 
|-id=071 bgcolor=#fefefe
| 359071 ||  || — || December 30, 2008 || Kitt Peak || Spacewatch || — || align=right data-sort-value="0.82" | 820 m || 
|-id=072 bgcolor=#fefefe
| 359072 ||  || — || December 30, 2008 || Kitt Peak || Spacewatch || V || align=right data-sort-value="0.86" | 860 m || 
|-id=073 bgcolor=#fefefe
| 359073 ||  || — || December 31, 2008 || Kitt Peak || Spacewatch || NYS || align=right data-sort-value="0.78" | 780 m || 
|-id=074 bgcolor=#fefefe
| 359074 ||  || — || December 30, 2008 || Kitt Peak || Spacewatch || — || align=right data-sort-value="0.86" | 860 m || 
|-id=075 bgcolor=#E9E9E9
| 359075 ||  || — || December 30, 2008 || Kitt Peak || Spacewatch || ADE || align=right | 2.4 km || 
|-id=076 bgcolor=#fefefe
| 359076 ||  || — || December 30, 2008 || Mount Lemmon || Mount Lemmon Survey || V || align=right data-sort-value="0.81" | 810 m || 
|-id=077 bgcolor=#fefefe
| 359077 ||  || — || December 30, 2008 || Kitt Peak || Spacewatch || NYS || align=right data-sort-value="0.72" | 720 m || 
|-id=078 bgcolor=#fefefe
| 359078 ||  || — || December 30, 2008 || Kitt Peak || Spacewatch || — || align=right data-sort-value="0.77" | 770 m || 
|-id=079 bgcolor=#fefefe
| 359079 ||  || — || December 30, 2008 || Kitt Peak || Spacewatch || — || align=right data-sort-value="0.82" | 820 m || 
|-id=080 bgcolor=#fefefe
| 359080 ||  || — || December 30, 2008 || Kitt Peak || Spacewatch || MAS || align=right data-sort-value="0.81" | 810 m || 
|-id=081 bgcolor=#fefefe
| 359081 ||  || — || December 22, 2008 || Kitt Peak || Spacewatch || — || align=right data-sort-value="0.86" | 860 m || 
|-id=082 bgcolor=#fefefe
| 359082 ||  || — || October 7, 2004 || Socorro || LINEAR || — || align=right | 1.1 km || 
|-id=083 bgcolor=#fefefe
| 359083 ||  || — || December 22, 2008 || Mount Lemmon || Mount Lemmon Survey || — || align=right data-sort-value="0.76" | 760 m || 
|-id=084 bgcolor=#fefefe
| 359084 ||  || — || December 22, 2008 || Mount Lemmon || Mount Lemmon Survey || NYS || align=right data-sort-value="0.68" | 680 m || 
|-id=085 bgcolor=#fefefe
| 359085 ||  || — || December 22, 2008 || Mount Lemmon || Mount Lemmon Survey || — || align=right data-sort-value="0.83" | 830 m || 
|-id=086 bgcolor=#fefefe
| 359086 ||  || — || December 30, 2008 || Mount Lemmon || Mount Lemmon Survey || — || align=right | 1.1 km || 
|-id=087 bgcolor=#fefefe
| 359087 ||  || — || December 30, 2008 || Mount Lemmon || Mount Lemmon Survey || NYS || align=right data-sort-value="0.67" | 670 m || 
|-id=088 bgcolor=#fefefe
| 359088 ||  || — || December 31, 2008 || Catalina || CSS || — || align=right data-sort-value="0.94" | 940 m || 
|-id=089 bgcolor=#fefefe
| 359089 ||  || — || December 29, 2008 || Mount Lemmon || Mount Lemmon Survey || MAS || align=right data-sort-value="0.77" | 770 m || 
|-id=090 bgcolor=#fefefe
| 359090 || 2009 AG || — || January 1, 2009 || Mayhill || A. Lowe || NYS || align=right data-sort-value="0.88" | 880 m || 
|-id=091 bgcolor=#fefefe
| 359091 ||  || — || January 2, 2009 || Mount Lemmon || Mount Lemmon Survey || NYS || align=right data-sort-value="0.70" | 700 m || 
|-id=092 bgcolor=#fefefe
| 359092 ||  || — || January 5, 2009 || Bisei SG Center || BATTeRS || — || align=right | 1.2 km || 
|-id=093 bgcolor=#fefefe
| 359093 ||  || — || January 2, 2009 || Mount Lemmon || Mount Lemmon Survey || NYS || align=right data-sort-value="0.77" | 770 m || 
|-id=094 bgcolor=#E9E9E9
| 359094 ||  || — || January 2, 2009 || Kitt Peak || Spacewatch || — || align=right | 1.2 km || 
|-id=095 bgcolor=#fefefe
| 359095 ||  || — || January 2, 2009 || Kitt Peak || Spacewatch || — || align=right | 1.0 km || 
|-id=096 bgcolor=#fefefe
| 359096 ||  || — || January 8, 2009 || Kitt Peak || Spacewatch || — || align=right data-sort-value="0.94" | 940 m || 
|-id=097 bgcolor=#fefefe
| 359097 ||  || — || January 15, 2009 || Kitt Peak || Spacewatch || NYS || align=right data-sort-value="0.75" | 750 m || 
|-id=098 bgcolor=#fefefe
| 359098 ||  || — || January 15, 2009 || Kitt Peak || Spacewatch || MAS || align=right data-sort-value="0.74" | 740 m || 
|-id=099 bgcolor=#fefefe
| 359099 ||  || — || January 1, 2009 || Kitt Peak || Spacewatch || FLO || align=right data-sort-value="0.74" | 740 m || 
|-id=100 bgcolor=#fefefe
| 359100 ||  || — || January 1, 2009 || Mount Lemmon || Mount Lemmon Survey || — || align=right | 1.2 km || 
|}

359101–359200 

|-bgcolor=#fefefe
| 359101 ||  || — || November 1, 2008 || Mount Lemmon || Mount Lemmon Survey || MAS || align=right data-sort-value="0.85" | 850 m || 
|-id=102 bgcolor=#fefefe
| 359102 ||  || — || January 3, 2009 || Mount Lemmon || Mount Lemmon Survey || V || align=right data-sort-value="0.77" | 770 m || 
|-id=103 bgcolor=#fefefe
| 359103 Ottopiene || 2009 BS ||  || January 16, 2009 || Calar Alto || F. Hormuth || — || align=right | 2.0 km || 
|-id=104 bgcolor=#fefefe
| 359104 ||  || — || December 15, 2004 || Kitt Peak || Spacewatch || — || align=right data-sort-value="0.82" | 820 m || 
|-id=105 bgcolor=#E9E9E9
| 359105 ||  || — || January 18, 2009 || Socorro || LINEAR || — || align=right | 1.1 km || 
|-id=106 bgcolor=#fefefe
| 359106 ||  || — || November 8, 2008 || Mount Lemmon || Mount Lemmon Survey || — || align=right data-sort-value="0.94" | 940 m || 
|-id=107 bgcolor=#fefefe
| 359107 ||  || — || January 17, 2009 || Socorro || LINEAR || NYS || align=right data-sort-value="0.70" | 700 m || 
|-id=108 bgcolor=#fefefe
| 359108 ||  || — || January 17, 2009 || Kitt Peak || Spacewatch || — || align=right data-sort-value="0.90" | 900 m || 
|-id=109 bgcolor=#fefefe
| 359109 ||  || — || January 17, 2009 || Kitt Peak || Spacewatch || — || align=right data-sort-value="0.75" | 750 m || 
|-id=110 bgcolor=#fefefe
| 359110 ||  || — || January 16, 2009 || Kitt Peak || Spacewatch || NYS || align=right data-sort-value="0.76" | 760 m || 
|-id=111 bgcolor=#fefefe
| 359111 ||  || — || January 16, 2009 || Kitt Peak || Spacewatch || MAS || align=right data-sort-value="0.90" | 900 m || 
|-id=112 bgcolor=#fefefe
| 359112 ||  || — || January 16, 2009 || Kitt Peak || Spacewatch || — || align=right | 1.1 km || 
|-id=113 bgcolor=#fefefe
| 359113 ||  || — || January 16, 2009 || Kitt Peak || Spacewatch || NYS || align=right data-sort-value="0.79" | 790 m || 
|-id=114 bgcolor=#fefefe
| 359114 ||  || — || January 16, 2009 || Kitt Peak || Spacewatch || NYS || align=right data-sort-value="0.84" | 840 m || 
|-id=115 bgcolor=#fefefe
| 359115 ||  || — || January 16, 2009 || Kitt Peak || Spacewatch || V || align=right data-sort-value="0.66" | 660 m || 
|-id=116 bgcolor=#fefefe
| 359116 ||  || — || January 16, 2009 || Kitt Peak || Spacewatch || MAS || align=right data-sort-value="0.81" | 810 m || 
|-id=117 bgcolor=#fefefe
| 359117 ||  || — || January 16, 2009 || Kitt Peak || Spacewatch || — || align=right | 1.2 km || 
|-id=118 bgcolor=#E9E9E9
| 359118 ||  || — || January 16, 2009 || Kitt Peak || Spacewatch || KRM || align=right | 2.1 km || 
|-id=119 bgcolor=#fefefe
| 359119 ||  || — || January 16, 2009 || Mount Lemmon || Mount Lemmon Survey || ERI || align=right | 1.7 km || 
|-id=120 bgcolor=#fefefe
| 359120 ||  || — || January 16, 2009 || Mount Lemmon || Mount Lemmon Survey || — || align=right data-sort-value="0.83" | 830 m || 
|-id=121 bgcolor=#fefefe
| 359121 ||  || — || January 16, 2009 || Mount Lemmon || Mount Lemmon Survey || MAS || align=right data-sort-value="0.84" | 840 m || 
|-id=122 bgcolor=#fefefe
| 359122 ||  || — || January 16, 2009 || Mount Lemmon || Mount Lemmon Survey || V || align=right data-sort-value="0.66" | 660 m || 
|-id=123 bgcolor=#fefefe
| 359123 ||  || — || January 16, 2009 || Mount Lemmon || Mount Lemmon Survey || MAS || align=right data-sort-value="0.90" | 900 m || 
|-id=124 bgcolor=#fefefe
| 359124 ||  || — || October 1, 2000 || Kitt Peak || Spacewatch || NYS || align=right data-sort-value="0.72" | 720 m || 
|-id=125 bgcolor=#fefefe
| 359125 ||  || — || January 20, 2009 || Kitt Peak || Spacewatch || — || align=right data-sort-value="0.98" | 980 m || 
|-id=126 bgcolor=#fefefe
| 359126 ||  || — || January 20, 2009 || Kitt Peak || Spacewatch || — || align=right data-sort-value="0.90" | 900 m || 
|-id=127 bgcolor=#fefefe
| 359127 ||  || — || January 20, 2009 || Kitt Peak || Spacewatch || — || align=right data-sort-value="0.86" | 860 m || 
|-id=128 bgcolor=#E9E9E9
| 359128 ||  || — || January 20, 2009 || Kitt Peak || Spacewatch || — || align=right | 1.5 km || 
|-id=129 bgcolor=#fefefe
| 359129 ||  || — || January 25, 2009 || Kitt Peak || Spacewatch || NYS || align=right data-sort-value="0.85" | 850 m || 
|-id=130 bgcolor=#fefefe
| 359130 ||  || — || January 1, 2009 || Kitt Peak || Spacewatch || — || align=right data-sort-value="0.95" | 950 m || 
|-id=131 bgcolor=#d6d6d6
| 359131 ||  || — || January 25, 2009 || Socorro || LINEAR || BRA || align=right | 2.0 km || 
|-id=132 bgcolor=#E9E9E9
| 359132 ||  || — || January 30, 2009 || Pla D'Arguines || R. Ferrando || EUN || align=right | 1.3 km || 
|-id=133 bgcolor=#fefefe
| 359133 ||  || — || January 30, 2009 || Socorro || LINEAR || — || align=right | 1.1 km || 
|-id=134 bgcolor=#fefefe
| 359134 ||  || — || January 20, 2009 || Catalina || CSS || — || align=right | 1.2 km || 
|-id=135 bgcolor=#fefefe
| 359135 ||  || — || January 25, 2009 || Kitt Peak || Spacewatch || MAS || align=right data-sort-value="0.74" | 740 m || 
|-id=136 bgcolor=#fefefe
| 359136 ||  || — || January 25, 2009 || Kitt Peak || Spacewatch || MAS || align=right data-sort-value="0.75" | 750 m || 
|-id=137 bgcolor=#fefefe
| 359137 ||  || — || April 9, 2002 || Anderson Mesa || LONEOS || — || align=right data-sort-value="0.94" | 940 m || 
|-id=138 bgcolor=#fefefe
| 359138 ||  || — || January 25, 2009 || Kitt Peak || Spacewatch || — || align=right data-sort-value="0.78" | 780 m || 
|-id=139 bgcolor=#fefefe
| 359139 ||  || — || January 25, 2009 || Kitt Peak || Spacewatch || NYS || align=right data-sort-value="0.61" | 610 m || 
|-id=140 bgcolor=#fefefe
| 359140 ||  || — || January 25, 2009 || Kitt Peak || Spacewatch || — || align=right data-sort-value="0.85" | 850 m || 
|-id=141 bgcolor=#fefefe
| 359141 ||  || — || January 25, 2009 || Kitt Peak || Spacewatch || — || align=right data-sort-value="0.90" | 900 m || 
|-id=142 bgcolor=#fefefe
| 359142 ||  || — || September 17, 2003 || Kitt Peak || Spacewatch || CLA || align=right | 1.8 km || 
|-id=143 bgcolor=#fefefe
| 359143 ||  || — || January 24, 2009 || Purple Mountain || PMO NEO || — || align=right | 1.2 km || 
|-id=144 bgcolor=#fefefe
| 359144 ||  || — || January 24, 2009 || Purple Mountain || PMO NEO || — || align=right data-sort-value="0.94" | 940 m || 
|-id=145 bgcolor=#fefefe
| 359145 ||  || — || January 25, 2009 || Kitt Peak || Spacewatch || LCI || align=right | 1.1 km || 
|-id=146 bgcolor=#fefefe
| 359146 ||  || — || January 25, 2009 || Kitt Peak || Spacewatch || — || align=right data-sort-value="0.94" | 940 m || 
|-id=147 bgcolor=#fefefe
| 359147 ||  || — || January 28, 2009 || Catalina || CSS || NYS || align=right data-sort-value="0.73" | 730 m || 
|-id=148 bgcolor=#fefefe
| 359148 ||  || — || January 29, 2009 || Kitt Peak || Spacewatch || V || align=right data-sort-value="0.67" | 670 m || 
|-id=149 bgcolor=#fefefe
| 359149 ||  || — || January 29, 2009 || Mount Lemmon || Mount Lemmon Survey || — || align=right | 1.2 km || 
|-id=150 bgcolor=#fefefe
| 359150 ||  || — || October 1, 2003 || Kitt Peak || Spacewatch || NYS || align=right data-sort-value="0.76" | 760 m || 
|-id=151 bgcolor=#fefefe
| 359151 ||  || — || January 30, 2009 || Kitt Peak || Spacewatch || NYS || align=right data-sort-value="0.60" | 600 m || 
|-id=152 bgcolor=#fefefe
| 359152 ||  || — || October 12, 2007 || Mount Lemmon || Mount Lemmon Survey || V || align=right data-sort-value="0.92" | 920 m || 
|-id=153 bgcolor=#fefefe
| 359153 ||  || — || January 31, 2009 || Kitt Peak || Spacewatch || V || align=right data-sort-value="0.66" | 660 m || 
|-id=154 bgcolor=#fefefe
| 359154 ||  || — || January 29, 2009 || Kitt Peak || Spacewatch || NYS || align=right data-sort-value="0.66" | 660 m || 
|-id=155 bgcolor=#fefefe
| 359155 ||  || — || January 30, 2009 || Mount Lemmon || Mount Lemmon Survey || — || align=right | 1.0 km || 
|-id=156 bgcolor=#fefefe
| 359156 ||  || — || January 31, 2009 || Mount Lemmon || Mount Lemmon Survey || V || align=right data-sort-value="0.59" | 590 m || 
|-id=157 bgcolor=#fefefe
| 359157 ||  || — || January 31, 2009 || Mount Lemmon || Mount Lemmon Survey || NYS || align=right data-sort-value="0.65" | 650 m || 
|-id=158 bgcolor=#fefefe
| 359158 ||  || — || January 29, 2009 || Kitt Peak || Spacewatch || — || align=right data-sort-value="0.78" | 780 m || 
|-id=159 bgcolor=#fefefe
| 359159 ||  || — || January 29, 2009 || Kitt Peak || Spacewatch || NYS || align=right data-sort-value="0.79" | 790 m || 
|-id=160 bgcolor=#fefefe
| 359160 ||  || — || January 16, 2009 || Kitt Peak || Spacewatch || MAS || align=right data-sort-value="0.81" | 810 m || 
|-id=161 bgcolor=#fefefe
| 359161 ||  || — || January 30, 2009 || Kitt Peak || Spacewatch || NYS || align=right data-sort-value="0.84" | 840 m || 
|-id=162 bgcolor=#fefefe
| 359162 ||  || — || January 31, 2009 || Kitt Peak || Spacewatch || CLA || align=right | 1.7 km || 
|-id=163 bgcolor=#E9E9E9
| 359163 ||  || — || January 31, 2009 || Kitt Peak || Spacewatch || — || align=right data-sort-value="0.93" | 930 m || 
|-id=164 bgcolor=#E9E9E9
| 359164 ||  || — || January 31, 2009 || Kitt Peak || Spacewatch || — || align=right | 1.1 km || 
|-id=165 bgcolor=#E9E9E9
| 359165 ||  || — || January 31, 2009 || Kitt Peak || Spacewatch || ADE || align=right | 1.3 km || 
|-id=166 bgcolor=#fefefe
| 359166 ||  || — || January 24, 2009 || Cerro Burek || Alianza S4 Obs. || V || align=right data-sort-value="0.77" | 770 m || 
|-id=167 bgcolor=#fefefe
| 359167 ||  || — || January 20, 2009 || Kitt Peak || Spacewatch || SVE || align=right | 2.2 km || 
|-id=168 bgcolor=#fefefe
| 359168 ||  || — || January 25, 2009 || Socorro || LINEAR || — || align=right | 1.5 km || 
|-id=169 bgcolor=#fefefe
| 359169 ||  || — || February 2, 2009 || Moletai || K. Černis, J. Zdanavičius || NYS || align=right data-sort-value="0.73" | 730 m || 
|-id=170 bgcolor=#FFC2E0
| 359170 ||  || — || February 13, 2009 || Črni Vrh || Črni Vrh || APOPHAcritical || align=right data-sort-value="0.36" | 360 m || 
|-id=171 bgcolor=#fefefe
| 359171 ||  || — || February 1, 2009 || Kitt Peak || Spacewatch || NYS || align=right data-sort-value="0.69" | 690 m || 
|-id=172 bgcolor=#fefefe
| 359172 ||  || — || February 2, 2009 || Mount Lemmon || Mount Lemmon Survey || — || align=right | 1.5 km || 
|-id=173 bgcolor=#E9E9E9
| 359173 ||  || — || February 1, 2009 || Mount Lemmon || Mount Lemmon Survey || — || align=right data-sort-value="0.88" | 880 m || 
|-id=174 bgcolor=#fefefe
| 359174 ||  || — || February 1, 2009 || Kitt Peak || Spacewatch || V || align=right data-sort-value="0.60" | 600 m || 
|-id=175 bgcolor=#fefefe
| 359175 ||  || — || February 1, 2009 || Kitt Peak || Spacewatch || — || align=right data-sort-value="0.90" | 900 m || 
|-id=176 bgcolor=#fefefe
| 359176 ||  || — || February 1, 2009 || Kitt Peak || Spacewatch || NYS || align=right data-sort-value="0.83" | 830 m || 
|-id=177 bgcolor=#fefefe
| 359177 ||  || — || February 1, 2009 || Kitt Peak || Spacewatch || — || align=right data-sort-value="0.84" | 840 m || 
|-id=178 bgcolor=#fefefe
| 359178 ||  || — || February 1, 2009 || Kitt Peak || Spacewatch || NYS || align=right data-sort-value="0.83" | 830 m || 
|-id=179 bgcolor=#E9E9E9
| 359179 ||  || — || February 1, 2009 || Kitt Peak || Spacewatch || — || align=right data-sort-value="0.98" | 980 m || 
|-id=180 bgcolor=#fefefe
| 359180 ||  || — || December 1, 2008 || Mount Lemmon || Mount Lemmon Survey || — || align=right | 1.1 km || 
|-id=181 bgcolor=#fefefe
| 359181 ||  || — || February 4, 2009 || Catalina || CSS || NYS || align=right data-sort-value="0.72" | 720 m || 
|-id=182 bgcolor=#fefefe
| 359182 ||  || — || February 14, 2009 || Dauban || F. Kugel || MAS || align=right data-sort-value="0.77" | 770 m || 
|-id=183 bgcolor=#fefefe
| 359183 ||  || — || February 13, 2009 || Kitt Peak || Spacewatch || — || align=right data-sort-value="0.75" | 750 m || 
|-id=184 bgcolor=#fefefe
| 359184 ||  || — || February 13, 2009 || Kitt Peak || Spacewatch || NYS || align=right data-sort-value="0.69" | 690 m || 
|-id=185 bgcolor=#fefefe
| 359185 ||  || — || February 14, 2009 || Kitt Peak || Spacewatch || V || align=right data-sort-value="0.72" | 720 m || 
|-id=186 bgcolor=#fefefe
| 359186 ||  || — || February 14, 2009 || Kitt Peak || Spacewatch || V || align=right data-sort-value="0.87" | 870 m || 
|-id=187 bgcolor=#fefefe
| 359187 ||  || — || February 14, 2009 || Kitt Peak || Spacewatch || — || align=right data-sort-value="0.82" | 820 m || 
|-id=188 bgcolor=#E9E9E9
| 359188 ||  || — || February 4, 2009 || Mount Lemmon || Mount Lemmon Survey || — || align=right data-sort-value="0.88" | 880 m || 
|-id=189 bgcolor=#E9E9E9
| 359189 ||  || — || February 3, 2009 || Mount Lemmon || Mount Lemmon Survey || — || align=right data-sort-value="0.85" | 850 m || 
|-id=190 bgcolor=#fefefe
| 359190 ||  || — || February 14, 2009 || Catalina || CSS || — || align=right | 1.4 km || 
|-id=191 bgcolor=#E9E9E9
| 359191 ||  || — || February 3, 2009 || Mount Lemmon || Mount Lemmon Survey || JUN || align=right | 1.1 km || 
|-id=192 bgcolor=#fefefe
| 359192 ||  || — || January 31, 2009 || Kitt Peak || Spacewatch || V || align=right data-sort-value="0.69" | 690 m || 
|-id=193 bgcolor=#E9E9E9
| 359193 ||  || — || July 4, 2002 || Kitt Peak || Spacewatch || — || align=right | 1.5 km || 
|-id=194 bgcolor=#E9E9E9
| 359194 ||  || — || February 21, 2009 || Skylive Obs. || F. Tozzi || — || align=right | 2.2 km || 
|-id=195 bgcolor=#fefefe
| 359195 ||  || — || February 21, 2009 || Mayhill || A. Lowe || EUT || align=right data-sort-value="0.79" | 790 m || 
|-id=196 bgcolor=#fefefe
| 359196 ||  || — || December 30, 2008 || Mount Lemmon || Mount Lemmon Survey || MAS || align=right data-sort-value="0.78" | 780 m || 
|-id=197 bgcolor=#fefefe
| 359197 ||  || — || February 16, 2009 || Catalina || CSS || NYS || align=right data-sort-value="0.68" | 680 m || 
|-id=198 bgcolor=#fefefe
| 359198 ||  || — || February 20, 2009 || Kitt Peak || Spacewatch || — || align=right | 1.0 km || 
|-id=199 bgcolor=#fefefe
| 359199 ||  || — || February 25, 2009 || Dauban || F. Kugel || — || align=right | 1.2 km || 
|-id=200 bgcolor=#fefefe
| 359200 ||  || — || February 26, 2009 || Socorro || LINEAR || — || align=right | 1.1 km || 
|}

359201–359300 

|-bgcolor=#E9E9E9
| 359201 ||  || — || March 12, 2005 || Kitt Peak || M. W. Buie || — || align=right data-sort-value="0.65" | 650 m || 
|-id=202 bgcolor=#E9E9E9
| 359202 ||  || — || February 22, 2009 || Kitt Peak || Spacewatch || — || align=right | 1.5 km || 
|-id=203 bgcolor=#E9E9E9
| 359203 ||  || — || February 22, 2009 || Kitt Peak || Spacewatch || JUL || align=right data-sort-value="0.93" | 930 m || 
|-id=204 bgcolor=#E9E9E9
| 359204 ||  || — || February 22, 2009 || Kitt Peak || Spacewatch || — || align=right data-sort-value="0.92" | 920 m || 
|-id=205 bgcolor=#E9E9E9
| 359205 ||  || — || February 22, 2009 || Kitt Peak || Spacewatch || — || align=right data-sort-value="0.91" | 910 m || 
|-id=206 bgcolor=#d6d6d6
| 359206 ||  || — || November 9, 2007 || Kitt Peak || Spacewatch || — || align=right | 2.6 km || 
|-id=207 bgcolor=#fefefe
| 359207 ||  || — || February 21, 2009 || Kitt Peak || Spacewatch || V || align=right data-sort-value="0.85" | 850 m || 
|-id=208 bgcolor=#fefefe
| 359208 ||  || — || February 16, 2009 || Catalina || CSS || — || align=right | 1.2 km || 
|-id=209 bgcolor=#E9E9E9
| 359209 ||  || — || February 22, 2009 || Kitt Peak || Spacewatch || MAR || align=right | 1.3 km || 
|-id=210 bgcolor=#fefefe
| 359210 ||  || — || February 24, 2009 || Kitt Peak || Spacewatch || V || align=right data-sort-value="0.73" | 730 m || 
|-id=211 bgcolor=#E9E9E9
| 359211 ||  || — || February 24, 2009 || Kitt Peak || Spacewatch || — || align=right data-sort-value="0.94" | 940 m || 
|-id=212 bgcolor=#E9E9E9
| 359212 ||  || — || February 24, 2009 || Kitt Peak || Spacewatch || — || align=right data-sort-value="0.97" | 970 m || 
|-id=213 bgcolor=#fefefe
| 359213 ||  || — || February 26, 2009 || Mount Lemmon || Mount Lemmon Survey || — || align=right data-sort-value="0.69" | 690 m || 
|-id=214 bgcolor=#E9E9E9
| 359214 ||  || — || February 26, 2009 || Kitt Peak || Spacewatch || — || align=right data-sort-value="0.91" | 910 m || 
|-id=215 bgcolor=#E9E9E9
| 359215 ||  || — || February 26, 2009 || Kitt Peak || Spacewatch || — || align=right data-sort-value="0.89" | 890 m || 
|-id=216 bgcolor=#E9E9E9
| 359216 ||  || — || February 26, 2009 || Kitt Peak || Spacewatch || — || align=right data-sort-value="0.84" | 840 m || 
|-id=217 bgcolor=#fefefe
| 359217 ||  || — || February 24, 2009 || Mount Lemmon || Mount Lemmon Survey || V || align=right data-sort-value="0.89" | 890 m || 
|-id=218 bgcolor=#E9E9E9
| 359218 ||  || — || February 27, 2009 || Kitt Peak || Spacewatch || — || align=right | 1.5 km || 
|-id=219 bgcolor=#E9E9E9
| 359219 ||  || — || February 27, 2009 || Kitt Peak || Spacewatch || — || align=right data-sort-value="0.87" | 870 m || 
|-id=220 bgcolor=#E9E9E9
| 359220 ||  || — || February 27, 2009 || Kitt Peak || Spacewatch || — || align=right data-sort-value="0.84" | 840 m || 
|-id=221 bgcolor=#E9E9E9
| 359221 ||  || — || March 11, 2005 || Mount Lemmon || Mount Lemmon Survey || — || align=right | 1.4 km || 
|-id=222 bgcolor=#E9E9E9
| 359222 ||  || — || February 19, 2009 || Kitt Peak || Spacewatch || — || align=right | 1.2 km || 
|-id=223 bgcolor=#E9E9E9
| 359223 ||  || — || April 24, 2000 || Kitt Peak || Spacewatch || — || align=right | 2.3 km || 
|-id=224 bgcolor=#fefefe
| 359224 ||  || — || February 20, 2009 || Mount Lemmon || Mount Lemmon Survey || — || align=right data-sort-value="0.87" | 870 m || 
|-id=225 bgcolor=#E9E9E9
| 359225 ||  || — || February 20, 2009 || Kitt Peak || Spacewatch || — || align=right | 1.2 km || 
|-id=226 bgcolor=#E9E9E9
| 359226 ||  || — || February 28, 2009 || Kitt Peak || Spacewatch || — || align=right data-sort-value="0.84" | 840 m || 
|-id=227 bgcolor=#E9E9E9
| 359227 ||  || — || February 19, 2009 || Kitt Peak || Spacewatch || — || align=right | 1.0 km || 
|-id=228 bgcolor=#E9E9E9
| 359228 ||  || — || February 20, 2009 || Kitt Peak || Spacewatch || — || align=right | 1.4 km || 
|-id=229 bgcolor=#E9E9E9
| 359229 ||  || — || February 22, 2009 || Siding Spring || SSS || — || align=right | 4.7 km || 
|-id=230 bgcolor=#E9E9E9
| 359230 ||  || — || February 28, 2009 || Kitt Peak || Spacewatch || — || align=right | 2.8 km || 
|-id=231 bgcolor=#E9E9E9
| 359231 ||  || — || February 27, 2009 || Mount Lemmon || Mount Lemmon Survey || — || align=right | 2.8 km || 
|-id=232 bgcolor=#fefefe
| 359232 ||  || — || March 15, 2009 || Kitt Peak || Spacewatch || V || align=right data-sort-value="0.78" | 780 m || 
|-id=233 bgcolor=#fefefe
| 359233 ||  || — || March 15, 2009 || Kitt Peak || Spacewatch || NYS || align=right data-sort-value="0.77" | 770 m || 
|-id=234 bgcolor=#fefefe
| 359234 ||  || — || March 15, 2009 || Kitt Peak || Spacewatch || — || align=right | 1.2 km || 
|-id=235 bgcolor=#E9E9E9
| 359235 ||  || — || September 28, 2006 || Mount Lemmon || Mount Lemmon Survey || JUN || align=right | 1.2 km || 
|-id=236 bgcolor=#fefefe
| 359236 ||  || — || March 15, 2009 || Kitt Peak || Spacewatch || — || align=right data-sort-value="0.79" | 790 m || 
|-id=237 bgcolor=#fefefe
| 359237 ||  || — || March 3, 2009 || Catalina || CSS || — || align=right | 1.2 km || 
|-id=238 bgcolor=#fefefe
| 359238 ||  || — || March 2, 2009 || Kitt Peak || Spacewatch || — || align=right data-sort-value="0.92" | 920 m || 
|-id=239 bgcolor=#E9E9E9
| 359239 ||  || — || March 1, 2009 || Kitt Peak || Spacewatch || — || align=right | 1.2 km || 
|-id=240 bgcolor=#E9E9E9
| 359240 ||  || — || March 2, 2009 || Mount Lemmon || Mount Lemmon Survey || — || align=right | 2.2 km || 
|-id=241 bgcolor=#E9E9E9
| 359241 ||  || — || March 8, 2009 || Mount Lemmon || Mount Lemmon Survey || — || align=right | 1.9 km || 
|-id=242 bgcolor=#FFC2E0
| 359242 ||  || — || March 17, 2009 || Catalina || CSS || APO || align=right data-sort-value="0.59" | 590 m || 
|-id=243 bgcolor=#fefefe
| 359243 || 2009 FW || — || March 16, 2009 || Tzec Maun || F. Tozzi || — || align=right | 1.2 km || 
|-id=244 bgcolor=#fefefe
| 359244 ||  || — || March 16, 2009 || La Sagra || OAM Obs. || — || align=right | 1.4 km || 
|-id=245 bgcolor=#E9E9E9
| 359245 ||  || — || March 17, 2009 || Marly || P. Kocher || MAR || align=right | 1.3 km || 
|-id=246 bgcolor=#E9E9E9
| 359246 ||  || — || March 17, 2009 || Mayhill || A. Lowe || — || align=right | 1.6 km || 
|-id=247 bgcolor=#E9E9E9
| 359247 ||  || — || March 16, 2009 || Kitt Peak || Spacewatch || — || align=right data-sort-value="0.98" | 980 m || 
|-id=248 bgcolor=#E9E9E9
| 359248 ||  || — || March 18, 2009 || Mount Lemmon || Mount Lemmon Survey || — || align=right | 2.8 km || 
|-id=249 bgcolor=#E9E9E9
| 359249 ||  || — || March 17, 2009 || Kitt Peak || Spacewatch || — || align=right | 1.3 km || 
|-id=250 bgcolor=#E9E9E9
| 359250 ||  || — || January 30, 2009 || Mount Lemmon || Mount Lemmon Survey || — || align=right | 1.2 km || 
|-id=251 bgcolor=#E9E9E9
| 359251 ||  || — || March 17, 2009 || Bergisch Gladbac || W. Bickel || — || align=right | 1.7 km || 
|-id=252 bgcolor=#E9E9E9
| 359252 ||  || — || March 22, 2009 || La Sagra || OAM Obs. || — || align=right data-sort-value="0.98" | 980 m || 
|-id=253 bgcolor=#E9E9E9
| 359253 ||  || — || March 18, 2009 || Mount Lemmon || Mount Lemmon Survey || — || align=right | 1.1 km || 
|-id=254 bgcolor=#E9E9E9
| 359254 ||  || — || March 22, 2009 || Hibiscus || N. Teamo || — || align=right data-sort-value="0.90" | 900 m || 
|-id=255 bgcolor=#E9E9E9
| 359255 ||  || — || February 7, 1999 || Kitt Peak || Spacewatch || — || align=right | 3.3 km || 
|-id=256 bgcolor=#E9E9E9
| 359256 ||  || — || March 16, 2009 || Kitt Peak || Spacewatch || — || align=right | 1.3 km || 
|-id=257 bgcolor=#fefefe
| 359257 ||  || — || March 21, 2009 || Catalina || CSS || — || align=right | 1.0 km || 
|-id=258 bgcolor=#E9E9E9
| 359258 ||  || — || March 26, 2009 || Mount Lemmon || Mount Lemmon Survey || NEM || align=right | 2.1 km || 
|-id=259 bgcolor=#E9E9E9
| 359259 ||  || — || March 21, 2009 || La Sagra || OAM Obs. || — || align=right | 1.1 km || 
|-id=260 bgcolor=#E9E9E9
| 359260 ||  || — || March 30, 2009 || Sierra Stars || F. Tozzi || BAR || align=right | 1.1 km || 
|-id=261 bgcolor=#E9E9E9
| 359261 ||  || — || March 21, 2009 || Catalina || CSS || — || align=right | 1.4 km || 
|-id=262 bgcolor=#E9E9E9
| 359262 ||  || — || March 22, 2009 || Siding Spring || SSS || HNS || align=right | 1.6 km || 
|-id=263 bgcolor=#E9E9E9
| 359263 ||  || — || January 13, 2000 || Kitt Peak || Spacewatch || — || align=right | 1.2 km || 
|-id=264 bgcolor=#E9E9E9
| 359264 ||  || — || March 16, 2009 || Kitt Peak || Spacewatch || — || align=right | 1.3 km || 
|-id=265 bgcolor=#E9E9E9
| 359265 ||  || — || March 29, 2009 || Kitt Peak || Spacewatch || — || align=right | 1.00 km || 
|-id=266 bgcolor=#E9E9E9
| 359266 ||  || — || March 21, 2009 || Mount Lemmon || Mount Lemmon Survey || — || align=right data-sort-value="0.86" | 860 m || 
|-id=267 bgcolor=#E9E9E9
| 359267 ||  || — || March 18, 2009 || Kitt Peak || Spacewatch || — || align=right | 1.2 km || 
|-id=268 bgcolor=#E9E9E9
| 359268 ||  || — || March 19, 2009 || Kitt Peak || Spacewatch || — || align=right | 1.4 km || 
|-id=269 bgcolor=#fefefe
| 359269 ||  || — || March 18, 2009 || Catalina || CSS || — || align=right | 1.2 km || 
|-id=270 bgcolor=#E9E9E9
| 359270 ||  || — || March 26, 2009 || Mount Lemmon || Mount Lemmon Survey || — || align=right | 1.7 km || 
|-id=271 bgcolor=#E9E9E9
| 359271 ||  || — || March 31, 2009 || Catalina || CSS || — || align=right | 3.0 km || 
|-id=272 bgcolor=#E9E9E9
| 359272 ||  || — || March 19, 2009 || Mount Lemmon || Mount Lemmon Survey || RAF || align=right | 1.3 km || 
|-id=273 bgcolor=#E9E9E9
| 359273 ||  || — || March 13, 2005 || Mount Lemmon || Mount Lemmon Survey || — || align=right | 1.7 km || 
|-id=274 bgcolor=#E9E9E9
| 359274 ||  || — || April 1, 2009 || Kitt Peak || Spacewatch || — || align=right | 1.5 km || 
|-id=275 bgcolor=#E9E9E9
| 359275 ||  || — || January 8, 2009 || Kitt Peak || Spacewatch || — || align=right | 2.0 km || 
|-id=276 bgcolor=#E9E9E9
| 359276 ||  || — || April 17, 2009 || Kitt Peak || Spacewatch || — || align=right | 1.4 km || 
|-id=277 bgcolor=#E9E9E9
| 359277 ||  || — || April 17, 2009 || Kitt Peak || Spacewatch || — || align=right | 2.3 km || 
|-id=278 bgcolor=#E9E9E9
| 359278 ||  || — || April 2, 2009 || Kitt Peak || Spacewatch || WIT || align=right | 1.2 km || 
|-id=279 bgcolor=#E9E9E9
| 359279 ||  || — || March 29, 2009 || Kitt Peak || Spacewatch || — || align=right | 1.1 km || 
|-id=280 bgcolor=#E9E9E9
| 359280 ||  || — || April 17, 2009 || Kitt Peak || Spacewatch || — || align=right | 2.2 km || 
|-id=281 bgcolor=#E9E9E9
| 359281 ||  || — || April 17, 2009 || Kitt Peak || Spacewatch || WIT || align=right | 1.0 km || 
|-id=282 bgcolor=#E9E9E9
| 359282 ||  || — || April 19, 2009 || Mount Lemmon || Mount Lemmon Survey || JUN || align=right | 1.1 km || 
|-id=283 bgcolor=#E9E9E9
| 359283 ||  || — || April 17, 2009 || Catalina || CSS || — || align=right | 1.2 km || 
|-id=284 bgcolor=#E9E9E9
| 359284 ||  || — || April 18, 2009 || Kitt Peak || Spacewatch || EUN || align=right | 1.7 km || 
|-id=285 bgcolor=#E9E9E9
| 359285 ||  || — || April 17, 2009 || Kitt Peak || Spacewatch || MAR || align=right | 1.1 km || 
|-id=286 bgcolor=#E9E9E9
| 359286 ||  || — || April 17, 2009 || Catalina || CSS || — || align=right | 1.8 km || 
|-id=287 bgcolor=#E9E9E9
| 359287 ||  || — || April 2, 2009 || Kitt Peak || Spacewatch || JUN || align=right | 1.3 km || 
|-id=288 bgcolor=#E9E9E9
| 359288 ||  || — || April 19, 2009 || Kitt Peak || Spacewatch || — || align=right | 1.5 km || 
|-id=289 bgcolor=#E9E9E9
| 359289 ||  || — || April 18, 2009 || Kitt Peak || Spacewatch || — || align=right | 1.8 km || 
|-id=290 bgcolor=#E9E9E9
| 359290 ||  || — || April 20, 2009 || Kitt Peak || Spacewatch || — || align=right | 1.4 km || 
|-id=291 bgcolor=#E9E9E9
| 359291 ||  || — || April 20, 2009 || Kitt Peak || Spacewatch || — || align=right | 1.5 km || 
|-id=292 bgcolor=#E9E9E9
| 359292 ||  || — || April 20, 2009 || Kitt Peak || Spacewatch || — || align=right | 1.2 km || 
|-id=293 bgcolor=#E9E9E9
| 359293 ||  || — || April 1, 2009 || Kitt Peak || Spacewatch || — || align=right | 1.6 km || 
|-id=294 bgcolor=#E9E9E9
| 359294 ||  || — || April 21, 2009 || La Sagra || OAM Obs. || — || align=right | 2.3 km || 
|-id=295 bgcolor=#E9E9E9
| 359295 ||  || — || April 22, 2009 || La Sagra || OAM Obs. || — || align=right data-sort-value="0.95" | 950 m || 
|-id=296 bgcolor=#E9E9E9
| 359296 ||  || — || April 21, 2009 || Kitt Peak || Spacewatch || — || align=right | 1.3 km || 
|-id=297 bgcolor=#E9E9E9
| 359297 ||  || — || April 22, 2009 || La Sagra || OAM Obs. || — || align=right | 3.4 km || 
|-id=298 bgcolor=#E9E9E9
| 359298 ||  || — || April 24, 2009 || Mount Lemmon || Mount Lemmon Survey || — || align=right | 2.2 km || 
|-id=299 bgcolor=#E9E9E9
| 359299 ||  || — || April 27, 2009 || Purple Mountain || PMO NEO || ADE || align=right | 3.2 km || 
|-id=300 bgcolor=#E9E9E9
| 359300 ||  || — || April 27, 2009 || Kitt Peak || Spacewatch || WIT || align=right | 1.1 km || 
|}

359301–359400 

|-bgcolor=#E9E9E9
| 359301 ||  || — || March 25, 2009 || Mount Lemmon || Mount Lemmon Survey || — || align=right | 2.9 km || 
|-id=302 bgcolor=#E9E9E9
| 359302 ||  || — || April 27, 2009 || Kitt Peak || Spacewatch || MRX || align=right | 1.0 km || 
|-id=303 bgcolor=#E9E9E9
| 359303 ||  || — || March 26, 2009 || Mount Lemmon || Mount Lemmon Survey || — || align=right | 2.1 km || 
|-id=304 bgcolor=#E9E9E9
| 359304 ||  || — || April 29, 2009 || Kitt Peak || Spacewatch || — || align=right | 1.8 km || 
|-id=305 bgcolor=#E9E9E9
| 359305 ||  || — || April 29, 2009 || Kitt Peak || Spacewatch || MRX || align=right | 1.3 km || 
|-id=306 bgcolor=#E9E9E9
| 359306 ||  || — || April 24, 2009 || Cerro Burek || Alianza S4 Obs. || — || align=right | 2.0 km || 
|-id=307 bgcolor=#E9E9E9
| 359307 ||  || — || April 21, 2009 || Mount Lemmon || Mount Lemmon Survey || — || align=right data-sort-value="0.99" | 990 m || 
|-id=308 bgcolor=#E9E9E9
| 359308 ||  || — || April 29, 2009 || Kitt Peak || Spacewatch || — || align=right | 2.1 km || 
|-id=309 bgcolor=#E9E9E9
| 359309 ||  || — || April 30, 2009 || Catalina || CSS || — || align=right | 1.3 km || 
|-id=310 bgcolor=#E9E9E9
| 359310 ||  || — || April 18, 2009 || Kitt Peak || Spacewatch || HOF || align=right | 2.5 km || 
|-id=311 bgcolor=#E9E9E9
| 359311 ||  || — || February 16, 2004 || Kitt Peak || Spacewatch || — || align=right | 1.8 km || 
|-id=312 bgcolor=#E9E9E9
| 359312 ||  || — || May 2, 2009 || Siding Spring || SSS || — || align=right | 3.1 km || 
|-id=313 bgcolor=#E9E9E9
| 359313 ||  || — || May 13, 2009 || Kitt Peak || Spacewatch || JUN || align=right | 1.4 km || 
|-id=314 bgcolor=#E9E9E9
| 359314 ||  || — || May 13, 2009 || Mount Lemmon || Mount Lemmon Survey || — || align=right | 1.5 km || 
|-id=315 bgcolor=#E9E9E9
| 359315 ||  || — || May 13, 2009 || Kitt Peak || Spacewatch || — || align=right | 2.2 km || 
|-id=316 bgcolor=#E9E9E9
| 359316 ||  || — || May 13, 2009 || Kitt Peak || Spacewatch || — || align=right | 2.4 km || 
|-id=317 bgcolor=#E9E9E9
| 359317 ||  || — || May 13, 2009 || Kitt Peak || Spacewatch || — || align=right | 1.9 km || 
|-id=318 bgcolor=#E9E9E9
| 359318 ||  || — || May 14, 2009 || Kitt Peak || Spacewatch || — || align=right | 1.2 km || 
|-id=319 bgcolor=#E9E9E9
| 359319 ||  || — || May 15, 2009 || Catalina || CSS || JUN || align=right | 1.1 km || 
|-id=320 bgcolor=#E9E9E9
| 359320 ||  || — || May 1, 2009 || Mount Lemmon || Mount Lemmon Survey || — || align=right | 1.6 km || 
|-id=321 bgcolor=#E9E9E9
| 359321 ||  || — || May 23, 2009 || Catalina || CSS || EUN || align=right | 1.1 km || 
|-id=322 bgcolor=#E9E9E9
| 359322 ||  || — || May 25, 2009 || Kitt Peak || Spacewatch || — || align=right | 1.8 km || 
|-id=323 bgcolor=#E9E9E9
| 359323 ||  || — || May 26, 2009 || Catalina || CSS || — || align=right | 3.5 km || 
|-id=324 bgcolor=#E9E9E9
| 359324 ||  || — || May 26, 2009 || Kitt Peak || Spacewatch || — || align=right | 2.5 km || 
|-id=325 bgcolor=#E9E9E9
| 359325 ||  || — || May 27, 2009 || Kitt Peak || Spacewatch || — || align=right | 2.9 km || 
|-id=326 bgcolor=#E9E9E9
| 359326 ||  || — || May 29, 2009 || Mount Lemmon || Mount Lemmon Survey || — || align=right | 1.9 km || 
|-id=327 bgcolor=#E9E9E9
| 359327 ||  || — || May 29, 2009 || Sandlot || G. Hug || — || align=right | 3.3 km || 
|-id=328 bgcolor=#E9E9E9
| 359328 ||  || — || May 30, 2009 || Mount Lemmon || Mount Lemmon Survey || — || align=right | 2.0 km || 
|-id=329 bgcolor=#d6d6d6
| 359329 ||  || — || June 15, 2009 || Kitt Peak || Spacewatch || — || align=right | 3.1 km || 
|-id=330 bgcolor=#d6d6d6
| 359330 ||  || — || July 26, 2009 || La Sagra || OAM Obs. || — || align=right | 3.0 km || 
|-id=331 bgcolor=#d6d6d6
| 359331 ||  || — || July 27, 2009 || Kitt Peak || Spacewatch || LIX || align=right | 4.2 km || 
|-id=332 bgcolor=#E9E9E9
| 359332 ||  || — || December 22, 2006 || 7300 Observatory || W. K. Y. Yeung || — || align=right | 3.8 km || 
|-id=333 bgcolor=#d6d6d6
| 359333 ||  || — || August 15, 2009 || Kitt Peak || Spacewatch || LIX || align=right | 4.4 km || 
|-id=334 bgcolor=#d6d6d6
| 359334 ||  || — || August 17, 2009 || Goodricke-Pigott || R. A. Tucker || — || align=right | 4.5 km || 
|-id=335 bgcolor=#d6d6d6
| 359335 ||  || — || August 16, 2009 || Kitt Peak || Spacewatch || — || align=right | 3.7 km || 
|-id=336 bgcolor=#fefefe
| 359336 ||  || — || August 29, 2009 || Cerro Burek || Alianza S4 Obs. || H || align=right data-sort-value="0.64" | 640 m || 
|-id=337 bgcolor=#d6d6d6
| 359337 ||  || — || August 27, 2009 || La Sagra || OAM Obs. || — || align=right | 2.9 km || 
|-id=338 bgcolor=#d6d6d6
| 359338 ||  || — || August 17, 2009 || Catalina || CSS || — || align=right | 4.5 km || 
|-id=339 bgcolor=#C2FFFF
| 359339 ||  || — || September 15, 2009 || Kitt Peak || Spacewatch || L4 || align=right | 13 km || 
|-id=340 bgcolor=#C2FFFF
| 359340 ||  || — || September 15, 2009 || Kitt Peak || Spacewatch || L4 || align=right | 8.2 km || 
|-id=341 bgcolor=#d6d6d6
| 359341 ||  || — || October 13, 2004 || Kitt Peak || Spacewatch || HYG || align=right | 3.2 km || 
|-id=342 bgcolor=#d6d6d6
| 359342 ||  || — || September 18, 2009 || Kitt Peak || Spacewatch || EUP || align=right | 4.2 km || 
|-id=343 bgcolor=#C2FFFF
| 359343 ||  || — || September 19, 2009 || Kitt Peak || Spacewatch || L4ARK || align=right | 7.5 km || 
|-id=344 bgcolor=#d6d6d6
| 359344 ||  || — || February 25, 2007 || Kitt Peak || Spacewatch || — || align=right | 3.5 km || 
|-id=345 bgcolor=#C2FFFF
| 359345 ||  || — || August 21, 2008 || Kitt Peak || Spacewatch || L4ERY || align=right | 7.6 km || 
|-id=346 bgcolor=#C2FFFF
| 359346 ||  || — || September 22, 2009 || Kitt Peak || Spacewatch || L4 || align=right | 8.9 km || 
|-id=347 bgcolor=#C2FFFF
| 359347 ||  || — || September 15, 2009 || Kitt Peak || Spacewatch || L4 || align=right | 8.2 km || 
|-id=348 bgcolor=#d6d6d6
| 359348 ||  || — || September 17, 2004 || Anderson Mesa || LONEOS || — || align=right | 2.8 km || 
|-id=349 bgcolor=#C2FFFF
| 359349 ||  || — || September 23, 2009 || Kitt Peak || Spacewatch || L4 || align=right | 7.1 km || 
|-id=350 bgcolor=#C2FFFF
| 359350 ||  || — || September 16, 2009 || Kitt Peak || Spacewatch || L4 || align=right | 7.9 km || 
|-id=351 bgcolor=#C2FFFF
| 359351 ||  || — || September 18, 2009 || Kitt Peak || Spacewatch || L4 || align=right | 8.6 km || 
|-id=352 bgcolor=#C2FFFF
| 359352 ||  || — || September 21, 2009 || Kitt Peak || Spacewatch || L4 || align=right | 12 km || 
|-id=353 bgcolor=#d6d6d6
| 359353 ||  || — || September 17, 2009 || Mount Lemmon || Mount Lemmon Survey || — || align=right | 2.4 km || 
|-id=354 bgcolor=#C2FFFF
| 359354 ||  || — || September 28, 2009 || Mount Lemmon || Mount Lemmon Survey || L4 || align=right | 8.8 km || 
|-id=355 bgcolor=#C2FFFF
| 359355 ||  || — || September 18, 2009 || Kitt Peak || Spacewatch || L4ARK || align=right | 7.8 km || 
|-id=356 bgcolor=#d6d6d6
| 359356 ||  || — || October 12, 2009 || Mount Lemmon || Mount Lemmon Survey || — || align=right | 3.8 km || 
|-id=357 bgcolor=#C2FFFF
| 359357 ||  || — || October 11, 2009 || Mount Lemmon || Mount Lemmon Survey || L4ERY || align=right | 8.7 km || 
|-id=358 bgcolor=#C2FFFF
| 359358 ||  || — || October 15, 2009 || Mount Lemmon || Mount Lemmon Survey || L4 || align=right | 6.8 km || 
|-id=359 bgcolor=#d6d6d6
| 359359 ||  || — || October 19, 2009 || Socorro || LINEAR || — || align=right | 4.0 km || 
|-id=360 bgcolor=#C2FFFF
| 359360 ||  || — || October 18, 2009 || Mount Lemmon || Mount Lemmon Survey || L4ERY || align=right | 9.7 km || 
|-id=361 bgcolor=#C2FFFF
| 359361 ||  || — || October 23, 2009 || Mount Lemmon || Mount Lemmon Survey || L4ERY || align=right | 10 km || 
|-id=362 bgcolor=#d6d6d6
| 359362 ||  || — || October 24, 2009 || Mount Lemmon || Mount Lemmon Survey || EOS || align=right | 2.2 km || 
|-id=363 bgcolor=#C2FFFF
| 359363 ||  || — || October 21, 2009 || Mount Lemmon || Mount Lemmon Survey || L4 || align=right | 6.5 km || 
|-id=364 bgcolor=#C2FFFF
| 359364 ||  || — || October 20, 2009 || Atacama || IAA-AI || L4 || align=right | 11 km || 
|-id=365 bgcolor=#C2FFFF
| 359365 ||  || — || November 8, 2009 || Kitt Peak || Spacewatch || L4 || align=right | 7.3 km || 
|-id=366 bgcolor=#C2FFFF
| 359366 ||  || — || March 18, 2002 || Kitt Peak || Spacewatch || L4 || align=right | 8.7 km || 
|-id=367 bgcolor=#d6d6d6
| 359367 ||  || — || November 9, 2009 || Catalina || CSS || — || align=right | 3.8 km || 
|-id=368 bgcolor=#C2FFFF
| 359368 ||  || — || November 16, 2009 || Mount Lemmon || Mount Lemmon Survey || L4ERY || align=right | 13 km || 
|-id=369 bgcolor=#FFC2E0
| 359369 ||  || — || December 17, 2009 || Socorro || LINEAR || APOPHA || align=right data-sort-value="0.74" | 740 m || 
|-id=370 bgcolor=#fefefe
| 359370 ||  || — || December 18, 2009 || Mount Lemmon || Mount Lemmon Survey || V || align=right data-sort-value="0.90" | 900 m || 
|-id=371 bgcolor=#fefefe
| 359371 ||  || — || January 6, 2010 || Kitt Peak || Spacewatch || H || align=right data-sort-value="0.82" | 820 m || 
|-id=372 bgcolor=#fefefe
| 359372 ||  || — || February 11, 2010 || WISE || WISE || PHO || align=right | 2.9 km || 
|-id=373 bgcolor=#fefefe
| 359373 ||  || — || February 8, 2010 || WISE || WISE || — || align=right | 2.1 km || 
|-id=374 bgcolor=#fefefe
| 359374 ||  || — || February 17, 2010 || WISE || WISE || FLO || align=right | 1.9 km || 
|-id=375 bgcolor=#fefefe
| 359375 ||  || — || February 17, 2010 || Socorro || LINEAR || H || align=right data-sort-value="0.89" | 890 m || 
|-id=376 bgcolor=#fefefe
| 359376 ||  || — || February 17, 2010 || WISE || WISE || — || align=right | 1.5 km || 
|-id=377 bgcolor=#fefefe
| 359377 ||  || — || February 16, 2010 || Catalina || CSS || — || align=right data-sort-value="0.95" | 950 m || 
|-id=378 bgcolor=#fefefe
| 359378 ||  || — || March 12, 2010 || Mount Lemmon || Mount Lemmon Survey || V || align=right data-sort-value="0.65" | 650 m || 
|-id=379 bgcolor=#fefefe
| 359379 ||  || — || March 12, 2010 || Kitt Peak || Spacewatch || — || align=right | 1.2 km || 
|-id=380 bgcolor=#fefefe
| 359380 ||  || — || March 12, 2010 || Kitt Peak || Spacewatch || — || align=right data-sort-value="0.96" | 960 m || 
|-id=381 bgcolor=#fefefe
| 359381 ||  || — || March 20, 2010 || Kitt Peak || Spacewatch || — || align=right | 1.4 km || 
|-id=382 bgcolor=#fefefe
| 359382 ||  || — || March 30, 2010 || WISE || WISE || — || align=right | 1.1 km || 
|-id=383 bgcolor=#fefefe
| 359383 ||  || — || March 19, 2010 || Kitt Peak || Spacewatch || — || align=right data-sort-value="0.73" | 730 m || 
|-id=384 bgcolor=#fefefe
| 359384 ||  || — || April 8, 2010 || Mount Lemmon || Mount Lemmon Survey || — || align=right data-sort-value="0.66" | 660 m || 
|-id=385 bgcolor=#fefefe
| 359385 ||  || — || April 14, 2010 || Kitt Peak || Spacewatch || FLO || align=right data-sort-value="0.66" | 660 m || 
|-id=386 bgcolor=#fefefe
| 359386 ||  || — || March 25, 2010 || Mount Lemmon || Mount Lemmon Survey || — || align=right data-sort-value="0.76" | 760 m || 
|-id=387 bgcolor=#fefefe
| 359387 ||  || — || April 10, 2010 || Mount Lemmon || Mount Lemmon Survey || V || align=right data-sort-value="0.74" | 740 m || 
|-id=388 bgcolor=#fefefe
| 359388 ||  || — || November 22, 2005 || Kitt Peak || Spacewatch || — || align=right data-sort-value="0.56" | 560 m || 
|-id=389 bgcolor=#fefefe
| 359389 ||  || — || April 15, 2010 || WISE || WISE || — || align=right | 3.1 km || 
|-id=390 bgcolor=#E9E9E9
| 359390 ||  || — || April 15, 2010 || WISE || WISE || — || align=right | 2.5 km || 
|-id=391 bgcolor=#fefefe
| 359391 ||  || — || August 24, 2011 || Haleakala || Pan-STARRS || — || align=right | 1.1 km || 
|-id=392 bgcolor=#fefefe
| 359392 ||  || — || April 16, 2010 || WISE || WISE || ERI || align=right | 1.9 km || 
|-id=393 bgcolor=#fefefe
| 359393 ||  || — || April 17, 2010 || Mount Lemmon || Mount Lemmon Survey || — || align=right | 1.6 km || 
|-id=394 bgcolor=#E9E9E9
| 359394 ||  || — || April 25, 2010 || WISE || WISE || — || align=right | 1.2 km || 
|-id=395 bgcolor=#fefefe
| 359395 ||  || — || April 20, 2010 || Kitt Peak || Spacewatch || FLO || align=right | 1.3 km || 
|-id=396 bgcolor=#E9E9E9
| 359396 ||  || — || April 28, 2010 || WISE || WISE || — || align=right | 2.4 km || 
|-id=397 bgcolor=#fefefe
| 359397 ||  || — || March 26, 2006 || Kitt Peak || Spacewatch || — || align=right | 1.0 km || 
|-id=398 bgcolor=#fefefe
| 359398 ||  || — || June 8, 2007 || Kitt Peak || Spacewatch || — || align=right data-sort-value="0.76" | 760 m || 
|-id=399 bgcolor=#fefefe
| 359399 ||  || — || May 3, 2010 || Kitt Peak || Spacewatch || FLO || align=right data-sort-value="0.52" | 520 m || 
|-id=400 bgcolor=#E9E9E9
| 359400 ||  || — || May 4, 2010 || WISE || WISE || — || align=right | 2.7 km || 
|}

359401–359500 

|-bgcolor=#FA8072
| 359401 ||  || — || May 6, 2010 || Mount Lemmon || Mount Lemmon Survey || — || align=right data-sort-value="0.66" | 660 m || 
|-id=402 bgcolor=#fefefe
| 359402 ||  || — || November 1, 2008 || Mount Lemmon || Mount Lemmon Survey || — || align=right data-sort-value="0.85" | 850 m || 
|-id=403 bgcolor=#fefefe
| 359403 ||  || — || August 25, 2004 || Kitt Peak || Spacewatch || — || align=right data-sort-value="0.58" | 580 m || 
|-id=404 bgcolor=#fefefe
| 359404 ||  || — || November 7, 2008 || Mount Lemmon || Mount Lemmon Survey || FLO || align=right data-sort-value="0.66" | 660 m || 
|-id=405 bgcolor=#fefefe
| 359405 ||  || — || February 2, 2006 || Kitt Peak || Spacewatch || FLO || align=right data-sort-value="0.65" | 650 m || 
|-id=406 bgcolor=#fefefe
| 359406 ||  || — || September 13, 2007 || Mount Lemmon || Mount Lemmon Survey || — || align=right | 1.1 km || 
|-id=407 bgcolor=#E9E9E9
| 359407 ||  || — || January 15, 2008 || Mount Lemmon || Mount Lemmon Survey || — || align=right | 2.7 km || 
|-id=408 bgcolor=#fefefe
| 359408 ||  || — || May 8, 2010 || Mount Lemmon || Mount Lemmon Survey || V || align=right data-sort-value="0.91" | 910 m || 
|-id=409 bgcolor=#fefefe
| 359409 ||  || — || May 11, 2010 || Mount Lemmon || Mount Lemmon Survey || — || align=right data-sort-value="0.99" | 990 m || 
|-id=410 bgcolor=#fefefe
| 359410 ||  || — || May 12, 2010 || Mount Lemmon || Mount Lemmon Survey || — || align=right data-sort-value="0.68" | 680 m || 
|-id=411 bgcolor=#d6d6d6
| 359411 ||  || — || October 11, 2005 || Anderson Mesa || LONEOS || URS || align=right | 5.5 km || 
|-id=412 bgcolor=#E9E9E9
| 359412 ||  || — || May 20, 2010 || WISE || WISE || — || align=right | 1.6 km || 
|-id=413 bgcolor=#d6d6d6
| 359413 ||  || — || May 25, 2010 || WISE || WISE || — || align=right | 3.8 km || 
|-id=414 bgcolor=#fefefe
| 359414 ||  || — || May 28, 2010 || WISE || WISE || — || align=right | 2.3 km || 
|-id=415 bgcolor=#E9E9E9
| 359415 ||  || — || May 30, 2010 || WISE || WISE || TIN || align=right | 2.7 km || 
|-id=416 bgcolor=#d6d6d6
| 359416 ||  || — || May 31, 2010 || WISE || WISE || EOS || align=right | 3.7 km || 
|-id=417 bgcolor=#fefefe
| 359417 ||  || — || June 4, 2010 || Catalina || CSS || — || align=right data-sort-value="0.99" | 990 m || 
|-id=418 bgcolor=#d6d6d6
| 359418 ||  || — || June 1, 2010 || WISE || WISE || LIX || align=right | 4.7 km || 
|-id=419 bgcolor=#d6d6d6
| 359419 ||  || — || March 6, 2008 || Mount Lemmon || Mount Lemmon Survey || — || align=right | 3.9 km || 
|-id=420 bgcolor=#d6d6d6
| 359420 ||  || — || October 27, 2005 || Catalina || CSS || — || align=right | 4.2 km || 
|-id=421 bgcolor=#fefefe
| 359421 ||  || — || February 17, 2010 || Kitt Peak || Spacewatch || FLO || align=right data-sort-value="0.68" | 680 m || 
|-id=422 bgcolor=#E9E9E9
| 359422 ||  || — || March 17, 2004 || Apache Point || SDSS || — || align=right | 2.4 km || 
|-id=423 bgcolor=#E9E9E9
| 359423 ||  || — || June 7, 2010 || WISE || WISE || — || align=right | 2.7 km || 
|-id=424 bgcolor=#E9E9E9
| 359424 ||  || — || June 7, 2010 || WISE || WISE || — || align=right | 2.7 km || 
|-id=425 bgcolor=#E9E9E9
| 359425 ||  || — || June 9, 2010 || WISE || WISE || — || align=right | 2.2 km || 
|-id=426 bgcolor=#d6d6d6
| 359426 Lacks ||  ||  || June 10, 2010 || WISE || WISE || VER || align=right | 2.8 km || 
|-id=427 bgcolor=#d6d6d6
| 359427 ||  || — || June 11, 2010 || WISE || WISE || — || align=right | 2.0 km || 
|-id=428 bgcolor=#d6d6d6
| 359428 ||  || — || June 11, 2010 || WISE || WISE || VER || align=right | 3.3 km || 
|-id=429 bgcolor=#E9E9E9
| 359429 ||  || — || June 12, 2010 || WISE || WISE || — || align=right | 2.1 km || 
|-id=430 bgcolor=#E9E9E9
| 359430 ||  || — || June 13, 2010 || WISE || WISE || ADE || align=right | 2.4 km || 
|-id=431 bgcolor=#d6d6d6
| 359431 ||  || — || June 14, 2010 || WISE || WISE || — || align=right | 3.7 km || 
|-id=432 bgcolor=#d6d6d6
| 359432 ||  || — || June 16, 2010 || WISE || WISE || SYL7:4 || align=right | 5.8 km || 
|-id=433 bgcolor=#d6d6d6
| 359433 ||  || — || October 25, 2005 || Kitt Peak || Spacewatch || — || align=right | 4.5 km || 
|-id=434 bgcolor=#E9E9E9
| 359434 ||  || — || June 22, 2010 || WISE || WISE || — || align=right | 3.6 km || 
|-id=435 bgcolor=#d6d6d6
| 359435 ||  || — || February 16, 2007 || Catalina || CSS || URS || align=right | 5.3 km || 
|-id=436 bgcolor=#d6d6d6
| 359436 ||  || — || June 24, 2010 || WISE || WISE || EOS || align=right | 3.1 km || 
|-id=437 bgcolor=#d6d6d6
| 359437 ||  || — || June 24, 2010 || WISE || WISE || — || align=right | 2.9 km || 
|-id=438 bgcolor=#d6d6d6
| 359438 ||  || — || June 25, 2010 || WISE || WISE || CRO || align=right | 4.2 km || 
|-id=439 bgcolor=#d6d6d6
| 359439 ||  || — || March 8, 2008 || Kitt Peak || Spacewatch || — || align=right | 4.5 km || 
|-id=440 bgcolor=#d6d6d6
| 359440 ||  || — || June 26, 2010 || WISE || WISE || — || align=right | 3.9 km || 
|-id=441 bgcolor=#E9E9E9
| 359441 ||  || — || June 26, 2010 || WISE || WISE || — || align=right | 2.1 km || 
|-id=442 bgcolor=#d6d6d6
| 359442 ||  || — || October 3, 1999 || Kitt Peak || Spacewatch || EUP || align=right | 2.9 km || 
|-id=443 bgcolor=#d6d6d6
| 359443 ||  || — || January 24, 2007 || Anderson Mesa || LONEOS || Tj (2.95) || align=right | 8.0 km || 
|-id=444 bgcolor=#fefefe
| 359444 ||  || — || June 24, 2010 || Mount Lemmon || Mount Lemmon Survey || — || align=right data-sort-value="0.77" | 770 m || 
|-id=445 bgcolor=#d6d6d6
| 359445 ||  || — || June 28, 2010 || WISE || WISE || — || align=right | 3.7 km || 
|-id=446 bgcolor=#d6d6d6
| 359446 ||  || — || February 17, 2007 || Kitt Peak || Spacewatch || URS || align=right | 3.7 km || 
|-id=447 bgcolor=#E9E9E9
| 359447 ||  || — || June 29, 2010 || WISE || WISE || AST || align=right | 2.8 km || 
|-id=448 bgcolor=#d6d6d6
| 359448 ||  || — || August 29, 2005 || Kitt Peak || Spacewatch || — || align=right | 3.2 km || 
|-id=449 bgcolor=#d6d6d6
| 359449 ||  || — || July 2, 2010 || WISE || WISE || — || align=right | 4.3 km || 
|-id=450 bgcolor=#E9E9E9
| 359450 ||  || — || September 30, 2006 || Mount Lemmon || Mount Lemmon Survey || MIS || align=right | 2.2 km || 
|-id=451 bgcolor=#d6d6d6
| 359451 ||  || — || July 5, 2010 || WISE || WISE || — || align=right | 5.6 km || 
|-id=452 bgcolor=#d6d6d6
| 359452 ||  || — || September 11, 2005 || Kitt Peak || Spacewatch || — || align=right | 4.1 km || 
|-id=453 bgcolor=#d6d6d6
| 359453 ||  || — || August 8, 2004 || Palomar || NEAT || VER || align=right | 3.9 km || 
|-id=454 bgcolor=#d6d6d6
| 359454 ||  || — || July 7, 2010 || WISE || WISE || SYL7:4 || align=right | 5.2 km || 
|-id=455 bgcolor=#d6d6d6
| 359455 ||  || — || July 8, 2010 || WISE || WISE || — || align=right | 4.9 km || 
|-id=456 bgcolor=#d6d6d6
| 359456 ||  || — || August 29, 2005 || Palomar || NEAT || BRA || align=right | 2.6 km || 
|-id=457 bgcolor=#d6d6d6
| 359457 ||  || — || October 1, 2005 || Catalina || CSS || 628 || align=right | 3.0 km || 
|-id=458 bgcolor=#d6d6d6
| 359458 ||  || — || July 9, 2010 || WISE || WISE || — || align=right | 2.8 km || 
|-id=459 bgcolor=#d6d6d6
| 359459 ||  || — || October 27, 2005 || Kitt Peak || Spacewatch || — || align=right | 4.2 km || 
|-id=460 bgcolor=#d6d6d6
| 359460 ||  || — || July 10, 2010 || WISE || WISE || — || align=right | 3.2 km || 
|-id=461 bgcolor=#d6d6d6
| 359461 ||  || — || September 9, 2004 || Kitt Peak || Spacewatch || URS || align=right | 4.5 km || 
|-id=462 bgcolor=#E9E9E9
| 359462 ||  || — || July 10, 2010 || WISE || WISE || BAR || align=right | 2.2 km || 
|-id=463 bgcolor=#E9E9E9
| 359463 ||  || — || September 19, 2001 || Socorro || LINEAR || ADE || align=right | 4.3 km || 
|-id=464 bgcolor=#d6d6d6
| 359464 ||  || — || July 11, 2010 || WISE || WISE || 7:4 || align=right | 4.9 km || 
|-id=465 bgcolor=#d6d6d6
| 359465 ||  || — || June 21, 2009 || Mount Lemmon || Mount Lemmon Survey || ALA || align=right | 5.4 km || 
|-id=466 bgcolor=#E9E9E9
| 359466 ||  || — || July 11, 2010 || WISE || WISE || ADE || align=right | 2.5 km || 
|-id=467 bgcolor=#d6d6d6
| 359467 ||  || — || July 11, 2010 || WISE || WISE || — || align=right | 4.0 km || 
|-id=468 bgcolor=#d6d6d6
| 359468 ||  || — || August 8, 2004 || Palomar || NEAT || — || align=right | 4.8 km || 
|-id=469 bgcolor=#d6d6d6
| 359469 ||  || — || July 15, 2010 || WISE || WISE || EUP || align=right | 6.4 km || 
|-id=470 bgcolor=#d6d6d6
| 359470 ||  || — || July 15, 2010 || WISE || WISE || EUP || align=right | 5.5 km || 
|-id=471 bgcolor=#d6d6d6
| 359471 ||  || — || April 8, 2008 || Kitt Peak || Spacewatch || CRO || align=right | 3.8 km || 
|-id=472 bgcolor=#E9E9E9
| 359472 ||  || — || July 14, 2010 || WISE || WISE || — || align=right | 3.9 km || 
|-id=473 bgcolor=#fefefe
| 359473 ||  || — || July 14, 2010 || La Sagra || OAM Obs. || — || align=right | 1.0 km || 
|-id=474 bgcolor=#d6d6d6
| 359474 ||  || — || August 12, 2004 || Cerro Tololo || L. H. Wasserman || — || align=right | 4.5 km || 
|-id=475 bgcolor=#d6d6d6
| 359475 ||  || — || October 23, 2005 || Catalina || CSS || — || align=right | 3.1 km || 
|-id=476 bgcolor=#E9E9E9
| 359476 ||  || — || July 17, 2010 || WISE || WISE || ADE || align=right | 2.5 km || 
|-id=477 bgcolor=#d6d6d6
| 359477 ||  || — || March 5, 2008 || Kitt Peak || Spacewatch || — || align=right | 4.1 km || 
|-id=478 bgcolor=#d6d6d6
| 359478 ||  || — || May 2, 2003 || Kitt Peak || Spacewatch || EOS || align=right | 4.2 km || 
|-id=479 bgcolor=#d6d6d6
| 359479 ||  || — || January 27, 2007 || Mount Lemmon || Mount Lemmon Survey || URS || align=right | 4.7 km || 
|-id=480 bgcolor=#E9E9E9
| 359480 ||  || — || October 21, 2001 || Socorro || LINEAR || — || align=right | 3.0 km || 
|-id=481 bgcolor=#d6d6d6
| 359481 ||  || — || October 22, 2005 || Kitt Peak || Spacewatch || — || align=right | 4.0 km || 
|-id=482 bgcolor=#E9E9E9
| 359482 ||  || — || July 20, 2010 || WISE || WISE || — || align=right | 3.7 km || 
|-id=483 bgcolor=#d6d6d6
| 359483 ||  || — || September 10, 2004 || Kitt Peak || Spacewatch || — || align=right | 3.2 km || 
|-id=484 bgcolor=#d6d6d6
| 359484 ||  || — || October 10, 2004 || Kitt Peak || Spacewatch || — || align=right | 3.9 km || 
|-id=485 bgcolor=#E9E9E9
| 359485 ||  || — || June 21, 2005 || Palomar || NEAT || — || align=right | 4.2 km || 
|-id=486 bgcolor=#E9E9E9
| 359486 ||  || — || February 27, 2009 || Mount Lemmon || Mount Lemmon Survey || — || align=right | 2.1 km || 
|-id=487 bgcolor=#d6d6d6
| 359487 ||  || — || November 25, 2005 || Catalina || CSS || URS || align=right | 5.2 km || 
|-id=488 bgcolor=#E9E9E9
| 359488 ||  || — || August 8, 2005 || Siding Spring || SSS || — || align=right | 3.7 km || 
|-id=489 bgcolor=#d6d6d6
| 359489 ||  || — || February 16, 2007 || Catalina || CSS || — || align=right | 5.5 km || 
|-id=490 bgcolor=#E9E9E9
| 359490 ||  || — || April 22, 2009 || Mount Lemmon || Mount Lemmon Survey || MIT || align=right | 3.6 km || 
|-id=491 bgcolor=#d6d6d6
| 359491 ||  || — || February 6, 2007 || Kitt Peak || Spacewatch || VER || align=right | 4.0 km || 
|-id=492 bgcolor=#d6d6d6
| 359492 ||  || — || October 25, 2005 || Mount Lemmon || Mount Lemmon Survey || — || align=right | 4.7 km || 
|-id=493 bgcolor=#d6d6d6
| 359493 ||  || — || December 25, 2001 || Kitt Peak || Spacewatch || TRP || align=right | 4.5 km || 
|-id=494 bgcolor=#d6d6d6
| 359494 ||  || — || January 10, 2007 || Kitt Peak || Spacewatch || — || align=right | 5.0 km || 
|-id=495 bgcolor=#d6d6d6
| 359495 ||  || — || August 18, 2004 || Siding Spring || SSS || — || align=right | 5.6 km || 
|-id=496 bgcolor=#d6d6d6
| 359496 ||  || — || August 7, 2004 || Campo Imperatore || CINEOS || — || align=right | 3.7 km || 
|-id=497 bgcolor=#d6d6d6
| 359497 ||  || — || June 30, 2005 || Palomar || NEAT || — || align=right | 3.4 km || 
|-id=498 bgcolor=#E9E9E9
| 359498 ||  || — || September 14, 2006 || Kitt Peak || Spacewatch || — || align=right | 1.4 km || 
|-id=499 bgcolor=#E9E9E9
| 359499 ||  || — || February 5, 2009 || Mount Lemmon || Mount Lemmon Survey || MAR || align=right | 1.0 km || 
|-id=500 bgcolor=#d6d6d6
| 359500 ||  || — || February 9, 2008 || Kitt Peak || Spacewatch || EOS || align=right | 2.3 km || 
|}

359501–359600 

|-bgcolor=#d6d6d6
| 359501 ||  || — || March 2, 2001 || Kitt Peak || Spacewatch || — || align=right | 4.3 km || 
|-id=502 bgcolor=#d6d6d6
| 359502 ||  || — || August 5, 2010 || Great Shefford || P. Birtwhistle || — || align=right | 3.6 km || 
|-id=503 bgcolor=#fefefe
| 359503 ||  || — || September 22, 2003 || Palomar || NEAT || V || align=right data-sort-value="0.94" | 940 m || 
|-id=504 bgcolor=#fefefe
| 359504 ||  || — || August 16, 2010 || La Sagra || OAM Obs. || MAS || align=right | 1.0 km || 
|-id=505 bgcolor=#d6d6d6
| 359505 ||  || — || September 14, 1999 || Socorro || LINEAR || TIR || align=right | 3.0 km || 
|-id=506 bgcolor=#E9E9E9
| 359506 ||  || — || March 4, 2001 || Kitt Peak || Spacewatch || — || align=right data-sort-value="0.89" | 890 m || 
|-id=507 bgcolor=#E9E9E9
| 359507 ||  || — || July 20, 2001 || Palomar || NEAT || JUN || align=right | 1.2 km || 
|-id=508 bgcolor=#d6d6d6
| 359508 ||  || — || September 1, 2010 || Socorro || LINEAR || — || align=right | 3.2 km || 
|-id=509 bgcolor=#E9E9E9
| 359509 ||  || — || September 17, 2006 || Kitt Peak || Spacewatch || RAF || align=right | 1.0 km || 
|-id=510 bgcolor=#d6d6d6
| 359510 ||  || — || September 23, 1997 || Kitt Peak || Spacewatch || 7:4 || align=right | 4.1 km || 
|-id=511 bgcolor=#d6d6d6
| 359511 ||  || — || September 25, 2005 || Kitt Peak || Spacewatch || — || align=right | 2.9 km || 
|-id=512 bgcolor=#d6d6d6
| 359512 ||  || — || April 30, 2003 || Kitt Peak || Spacewatch || — || align=right | 2.9 km || 
|-id=513 bgcolor=#d6d6d6
| 359513 ||  || — || July 8, 2005 || Kitt Peak || Spacewatch || — || align=right | 2.7 km || 
|-id=514 bgcolor=#d6d6d6
| 359514 ||  || — || April 13, 2008 || Mount Lemmon || Mount Lemmon Survey || — || align=right | 3.0 km || 
|-id=515 bgcolor=#E9E9E9
| 359515 ||  || — || March 10, 2004 || Palomar || NEAT || EUN || align=right | 1.7 km || 
|-id=516 bgcolor=#d6d6d6
| 359516 ||  || — || November 28, 1994 || Kitt Peak || Spacewatch || — || align=right | 2.7 km || 
|-id=517 bgcolor=#E9E9E9
| 359517 ||  || — || October 2, 2006 || Mount Lemmon || Mount Lemmon Survey || — || align=right | 2.3 km || 
|-id=518 bgcolor=#d6d6d6
| 359518 ||  || — || January 26, 2007 || Kitt Peak || Spacewatch || HYG || align=right | 2.9 km || 
|-id=519 bgcolor=#E9E9E9
| 359519 ||  || — || July 29, 2001 || Palomar || NEAT || — || align=right | 1.8 km || 
|-id=520 bgcolor=#d6d6d6
| 359520 ||  || — || April 3, 2003 || Anderson Mesa || LONEOS || EOS || align=right | 2.5 km || 
|-id=521 bgcolor=#E9E9E9
| 359521 ||  || — || July 2, 2005 || Kitt Peak || Spacewatch || — || align=right | 2.4 km || 
|-id=522 bgcolor=#E9E9E9
| 359522 ||  || — || August 24, 2001 || Kitt Peak || Spacewatch || PAD || align=right | 1.5 km || 
|-id=523 bgcolor=#d6d6d6
| 359523 ||  || — || September 2, 2010 || Mount Lemmon || Mount Lemmon Survey || — || align=right | 3.7 km || 
|-id=524 bgcolor=#d6d6d6
| 359524 ||  || — || February 1, 2008 || Mount Lemmon || Mount Lemmon Survey || EOS || align=right | 2.1 km || 
|-id=525 bgcolor=#d6d6d6
| 359525 ||  || — || September 23, 2005 || Kitt Peak || Spacewatch || EOS || align=right | 2.2 km || 
|-id=526 bgcolor=#d6d6d6
| 359526 ||  || — || August 12, 2010 || Kitt Peak || Spacewatch || — || align=right | 3.3 km || 
|-id=527 bgcolor=#d6d6d6
| 359527 ||  || — || August 29, 2005 || Palomar || NEAT || — || align=right | 3.0 km || 
|-id=528 bgcolor=#d6d6d6
| 359528 ||  || — || April 24, 2003 || Kitt Peak || Spacewatch || — || align=right | 2.7 km || 
|-id=529 bgcolor=#d6d6d6
| 359529 ||  || — || October 28, 2005 || Kitt Peak || Spacewatch || — || align=right | 2.7 km || 
|-id=530 bgcolor=#d6d6d6
| 359530 ||  || — || March 31, 2008 || Mount Lemmon || Mount Lemmon Survey || — || align=right | 4.1 km || 
|-id=531 bgcolor=#d6d6d6
| 359531 ||  || — || September 29, 2005 || Mount Lemmon || Mount Lemmon Survey || KOR || align=right | 1.7 km || 
|-id=532 bgcolor=#d6d6d6
| 359532 ||  || — || April 4, 2008 || Kitt Peak || Spacewatch || EOS || align=right | 2.0 km || 
|-id=533 bgcolor=#d6d6d6
| 359533 ||  || — || October 6, 2005 || Mount Lemmon || Mount Lemmon Survey || — || align=right | 2.6 km || 
|-id=534 bgcolor=#d6d6d6
| 359534 ||  || — || March 1, 2008 || Kitt Peak || Spacewatch || — || align=right | 2.9 km || 
|-id=535 bgcolor=#E9E9E9
| 359535 ||  || — || October 20, 2006 || Kitt Peak || Spacewatch || — || align=right | 1.5 km || 
|-id=536 bgcolor=#d6d6d6
| 359536 ||  || — || August 30, 2005 || Kitt Peak || Spacewatch || CHA || align=right | 2.1 km || 
|-id=537 bgcolor=#d6d6d6
| 359537 ||  || — || September 13, 2005 || Kitt Peak || Spacewatch || KOR || align=right | 1.4 km || 
|-id=538 bgcolor=#d6d6d6
| 359538 ||  || — || September 18, 1995 || Kitt Peak || Spacewatch || — || align=right | 2.7 km || 
|-id=539 bgcolor=#E9E9E9
| 359539 ||  || — || September 18, 2001 || Kitt Peak || Spacewatch || — || align=right | 1.8 km || 
|-id=540 bgcolor=#d6d6d6
| 359540 ||  || — || October 29, 2005 || Kitt Peak || Spacewatch || — || align=right | 3.7 km || 
|-id=541 bgcolor=#E9E9E9
| 359541 ||  || — || February 14, 1999 || Kitt Peak || Spacewatch || — || align=right | 2.6 km || 
|-id=542 bgcolor=#d6d6d6
| 359542 ||  || — || March 5, 2008 || Kitt Peak || Spacewatch || — || align=right | 3.4 km || 
|-id=543 bgcolor=#fefefe
| 359543 ||  || — || September 9, 2010 || Kitt Peak || Spacewatch || — || align=right data-sort-value="0.75" | 750 m || 
|-id=544 bgcolor=#E9E9E9
| 359544 ||  || — || January 20, 2008 || Mount Lemmon || Mount Lemmon Survey || — || align=right | 2.1 km || 
|-id=545 bgcolor=#d6d6d6
| 359545 ||  || — || September 4, 2010 || Kitt Peak || Spacewatch || — || align=right | 3.8 km || 
|-id=546 bgcolor=#d6d6d6
| 359546 ||  || — || February 8, 2007 || Kitt Peak || Spacewatch || — || align=right | 3.8 km || 
|-id=547 bgcolor=#E9E9E9
| 359547 ||  || — || November 22, 2006 || Mount Lemmon || Mount Lemmon Survey || — || align=right | 1.5 km || 
|-id=548 bgcolor=#E9E9E9
| 359548 ||  || — || May 10, 2005 || Mount Lemmon || Mount Lemmon Survey || — || align=right | 1.1 km || 
|-id=549 bgcolor=#d6d6d6
| 359549 ||  || — || September 13, 2005 || Kitt Peak || Spacewatch || KOR || align=right | 1.5 km || 
|-id=550 bgcolor=#d6d6d6
| 359550 ||  || — || December 30, 2000 || Kitt Peak || Spacewatch || VER || align=right | 3.5 km || 
|-id=551 bgcolor=#d6d6d6
| 359551 ||  || — || October 29, 2005 || Catalina || CSS || EOS || align=right | 2.4 km || 
|-id=552 bgcolor=#d6d6d6
| 359552 ||  || — || April 7, 2008 || Mount Lemmon || Mount Lemmon Survey || EOS || align=right | 1.9 km || 
|-id=553 bgcolor=#d6d6d6
| 359553 ||  || — || March 2, 2008 || Kitt Peak || Spacewatch || EOS || align=right | 2.4 km || 
|-id=554 bgcolor=#d6d6d6
| 359554 ||  || — || October 31, 2005 || Kitt Peak || Spacewatch || — || align=right | 3.3 km || 
|-id=555 bgcolor=#E9E9E9
| 359555 ||  || — || September 16, 2006 || Catalina || CSS || — || align=right | 1.4 km || 
|-id=556 bgcolor=#d6d6d6
| 359556 ||  || — || September 17, 2010 || Mount Lemmon || Mount Lemmon Survey || — || align=right | 4.0 km || 
|-id=557 bgcolor=#d6d6d6
| 359557 ||  || — || September 5, 1999 || Catalina || CSS || — || align=right | 3.7 km || 
|-id=558 bgcolor=#d6d6d6
| 359558 ||  || — || July 20, 1999 || Kitt Peak || Spacewatch || EOS || align=right | 2.0 km || 
|-id=559 bgcolor=#d6d6d6
| 359559 ||  || — || October 26, 2005 || Anderson Mesa || LONEOS || — || align=right | 3.7 km || 
|-id=560 bgcolor=#d6d6d6
| 359560 ||  || — || November 4, 1999 || Kitt Peak || Spacewatch || — || align=right | 2.1 km || 
|-id=561 bgcolor=#E9E9E9
| 359561 ||  || — || February 27, 2009 || Mount Lemmon || Mount Lemmon Survey || — || align=right | 2.5 km || 
|-id=562 bgcolor=#E9E9E9
| 359562 ||  || — || November 15, 2006 || Catalina || CSS || — || align=right | 3.0 km || 
|-id=563 bgcolor=#d6d6d6
| 359563 ||  || — || March 29, 2008 || Mount Lemmon || Mount Lemmon Survey || KOR || align=right | 1.3 km || 
|-id=564 bgcolor=#E9E9E9
| 359564 ||  || — || August 19, 2001 || Cerro Tololo || M. W. Buie || MIS || align=right | 2.6 km || 
|-id=565 bgcolor=#E9E9E9
| 359565 ||  || — || August 31, 2005 || Kitt Peak || Spacewatch || HNA || align=right | 2.5 km || 
|-id=566 bgcolor=#E9E9E9
| 359566 ||  || — || August 28, 2005 || Kitt Peak || Spacewatch || — || align=right | 2.5 km || 
|-id=567 bgcolor=#E9E9E9
| 359567 ||  || — || May 18, 2004 || Campo Imperatore || CINEOS || — || align=right | 3.0 km || 
|-id=568 bgcolor=#d6d6d6
| 359568 ||  || — || August 23, 2004 || Kitt Peak || Spacewatch || — || align=right | 3.2 km || 
|-id=569 bgcolor=#d6d6d6
| 359569 ||  || — || October 2, 2005 || Mount Lemmon || Mount Lemmon Survey || — || align=right | 2.3 km || 
|-id=570 bgcolor=#d6d6d6
| 359570 ||  || — || November 26, 2005 || Mount Lemmon || Mount Lemmon Survey || — || align=right | 3.0 km || 
|-id=571 bgcolor=#d6d6d6
| 359571 ||  || — || October 9, 2010 || Catalina || CSS || EOS || align=right | 3.1 km || 
|-id=572 bgcolor=#E9E9E9
| 359572 ||  || — || August 26, 2005 || Palomar || NEAT || MRX || align=right | 1.1 km || 
|-id=573 bgcolor=#d6d6d6
| 359573 ||  || — || August 22, 2004 || Kitt Peak || Spacewatch || — || align=right | 3.7 km || 
|-id=574 bgcolor=#E9E9E9
| 359574 ||  || — || November 1, 2006 || Mount Lemmon || Mount Lemmon Survey || — || align=right | 2.7 km || 
|-id=575 bgcolor=#E9E9E9
| 359575 ||  || — || February 7, 2000 || Kitt Peak || Spacewatch || — || align=right | 1.2 km || 
|-id=576 bgcolor=#d6d6d6
| 359576 ||  || — || January 27, 2007 || Kitt Peak || Spacewatch || EOS || align=right | 2.3 km || 
|-id=577 bgcolor=#E9E9E9
| 359577 ||  || — || September 28, 2006 || Catalina || CSS || ADE || align=right | 3.2 km || 
|-id=578 bgcolor=#d6d6d6
| 359578 ||  || — || September 7, 2004 || Kitt Peak || Spacewatch || — || align=right | 3.9 km || 
|-id=579 bgcolor=#d6d6d6
| 359579 ||  || — || August 23, 2004 || Kitt Peak || Spacewatch || — || align=right | 2.9 km || 
|-id=580 bgcolor=#d6d6d6
| 359580 ||  || — || April 4, 2003 || Kitt Peak || Spacewatch || — || align=right | 3.6 km || 
|-id=581 bgcolor=#d6d6d6
| 359581 ||  || — || October 17, 2010 || Mount Lemmon || Mount Lemmon Survey || EOS || align=right | 2.4 km || 
|-id=582 bgcolor=#d6d6d6
| 359582 ||  || — || September 30, 2005 || Mount Lemmon || Mount Lemmon Survey || — || align=right | 2.9 km || 
|-id=583 bgcolor=#d6d6d6
| 359583 ||  || — || November 5, 1994 || Kitt Peak || Spacewatch || — || align=right | 3.5 km || 
|-id=584 bgcolor=#d6d6d6
| 359584 ||  || — || June 4, 2003 || Kitt Peak || Spacewatch || ALA || align=right | 5.6 km || 
|-id=585 bgcolor=#C2FFFF
| 359585 ||  || — || August 29, 2009 || Kitt Peak || Spacewatch || L4 || align=right | 8.4 km || 
|-id=586 bgcolor=#d6d6d6
| 359586 ||  || — || September 30, 1999 || Kitt Peak || Spacewatch || — || align=right | 4.1 km || 
|-id=587 bgcolor=#E9E9E9
| 359587 ||  || — || August 31, 2005 || Palomar || NEAT || GAL || align=right | 1.8 km || 
|-id=588 bgcolor=#d6d6d6
| 359588 ||  || — || September 15, 2004 || Kitt Peak || Spacewatch || — || align=right | 3.3 km || 
|-id=589 bgcolor=#d6d6d6
| 359589 ||  || — || September 14, 2004 || Anderson Mesa || LONEOS || VER || align=right | 3.9 km || 
|-id=590 bgcolor=#d6d6d6
| 359590 ||  || — || September 3, 2010 || Mount Lemmon || Mount Lemmon Survey || EOS || align=right | 2.6 km || 
|-id=591 bgcolor=#d6d6d6
| 359591 ||  || — || October 5, 2004 || Palomar || NEAT || VER || align=right | 3.2 km || 
|-id=592 bgcolor=#FFC2E0
| 359592 ||  || — || November 2, 2010 || Mount Lemmon || Mount Lemmon Survey || AMO || align=right data-sort-value="0.38" | 380 m || 
|-id=593 bgcolor=#d6d6d6
| 359593 ||  || — || December 27, 2006 || Mount Lemmon || Mount Lemmon Survey || — || align=right | 3.9 km || 
|-id=594 bgcolor=#C2FFFF
| 359594 ||  || — || September 17, 2009 || Kitt Peak || Spacewatch || L4ERY || align=right | 8.0 km || 
|-id=595 bgcolor=#d6d6d6
| 359595 ||  || — || October 7, 2004 || Anderson Mesa || LONEOS || — || align=right | 4.3 km || 
|-id=596 bgcolor=#d6d6d6
| 359596 ||  || — || March 26, 2008 || Mount Lemmon || Mount Lemmon Survey || — || align=right | 2.9 km || 
|-id=597 bgcolor=#d6d6d6
| 359597 ||  || — || August 20, 2004 || Kitt Peak || Spacewatch || — || align=right | 2.9 km || 
|-id=598 bgcolor=#C2FFFF
| 359598 ||  || — || April 30, 2003 || Kitt Peak || Spacewatch || L4 || align=right | 8.0 km || 
|-id=599 bgcolor=#E9E9E9
| 359599 ||  || — || December 1, 2006 || Kitt Peak || Spacewatch || — || align=right | 1.3 km || 
|-id=600 bgcolor=#d6d6d6
| 359600 ||  || — || September 8, 2004 || Socorro || LINEAR || — || align=right | 3.7 km || 
|}

359601–359700 

|-bgcolor=#d6d6d6
| 359601 ||  || — || May 10, 2002 || Palomar || NEAT || — || align=right | 4.5 km || 
|-id=602 bgcolor=#d6d6d6
| 359602 ||  || — || March 13, 2002 || Socorro || LINEAR || TIR || align=right | 3.8 km || 
|-id=603 bgcolor=#C2FFFF
| 359603 ||  || — || September 20, 2009 || Kitt Peak || Spacewatch || L4 || align=right | 8.1 km || 
|-id=604 bgcolor=#C2FFFF
| 359604 ||  || — || September 23, 2009 || Kitt Peak || Spacewatch || L4 || align=right | 7.3 km || 
|-id=605 bgcolor=#d6d6d6
| 359605 ||  || — || June 9, 2007 || Siding Spring || SSS || 3:2 || align=right | 7.7 km || 
|-id=606 bgcolor=#C2FFFF
| 359606 ||  || — || November 1, 2010 || Kitt Peak || Spacewatch || L4 || align=right | 8.2 km || 
|-id=607 bgcolor=#C2FFFF
| 359607 ||  || — || October 26, 2009 || Kitt Peak || Spacewatch || L4 || align=right | 8.7 km || 
|-id=608 bgcolor=#d6d6d6
| 359608 ||  || — || October 23, 2009 || Kitt Peak || Spacewatch || 3:2 || align=right | 5.1 km || 
|-id=609 bgcolor=#d6d6d6
| 359609 ||  || — || April 11, 2002 || Socorro || LINEAR || — || align=right | 4.0 km || 
|-id=610 bgcolor=#C2FFFF
| 359610 ||  || — || October 6, 2008 || Mount Lemmon || Mount Lemmon Survey || L4 || align=right | 5.4 km || 
|-id=611 bgcolor=#E9E9E9
| 359611 ||  || — || October 22, 2006 || Mount Lemmon || Mount Lemmon Survey || — || align=right | 1.2 km || 
|-id=612 bgcolor=#d6d6d6
| 359612 ||  || — || August 8, 2004 || Socorro || LINEAR || — || align=right | 3.9 km || 
|-id=613 bgcolor=#d6d6d6
| 359613 ||  || — || February 17, 2007 || Kitt Peak || Spacewatch || — || align=right | 3.3 km || 
|-id=614 bgcolor=#C2FFFF
| 359614 ||  || — || December 14, 2010 || Mount Lemmon || Mount Lemmon Survey || L4 || align=right | 11 km || 
|-id=615 bgcolor=#fefefe
| 359615 ||  || — || September 30, 2006 || Siding Spring || SSS || H || align=right data-sort-value="0.97" | 970 m || 
|-id=616 bgcolor=#C2FFFF
| 359616 ||  || — || May 8, 2011 || Mount Lemmon || Mount Lemmon Survey || L5 || align=right | 12 km || 
|-id=617 bgcolor=#E9E9E9
| 359617 ||  || — || February 19, 2009 || Mount Lemmon || Mount Lemmon Survey || — || align=right | 1.2 km || 
|-id=618 bgcolor=#fefefe
| 359618 ||  || — || December 13, 2009 || Socorro || LINEAR || H || align=right | 1.0 km || 
|-id=619 bgcolor=#E9E9E9
| 359619 ||  || — || July 25, 2003 || Palomar || NEAT || — || align=right data-sort-value="0.99" | 990 m || 
|-id=620 bgcolor=#E9E9E9
| 359620 ||  || — || September 19, 2003 || Anderson Mesa || LONEOS || — || align=right | 1.5 km || 
|-id=621 bgcolor=#E9E9E9
| 359621 ||  || — || November 20, 2003 || Kitt Peak || L. H. Wasserman || GEF || align=right | 1.4 km || 
|-id=622 bgcolor=#fefefe
| 359622 ||  || — || September 24, 2008 || Kitt Peak || Spacewatch || FLO || align=right data-sort-value="0.66" | 660 m || 
|-id=623 bgcolor=#fefefe
| 359623 ||  || — || September 23, 2008 || Catalina || CSS || — || align=right data-sort-value="0.84" | 840 m || 
|-id=624 bgcolor=#fefefe
| 359624 ||  || — || January 7, 2010 || Catalina || CSS || H || align=right | 1.1 km || 
|-id=625 bgcolor=#E9E9E9
| 359625 ||  || — || September 12, 2007 || Catalina || CSS || — || align=right | 1.8 km || 
|-id=626 bgcolor=#E9E9E9
| 359626 ||  || — || September 27, 1998 || Anderson Mesa || LONEOS || — || align=right | 2.1 km || 
|-id=627 bgcolor=#fefefe
| 359627 ||  || — || October 9, 2004 || Anderson Mesa || LONEOS || V || align=right data-sort-value="0.76" | 760 m || 
|-id=628 bgcolor=#fefefe
| 359628 ||  || — || January 20, 2009 || Mount Lemmon || Mount Lemmon Survey || — || align=right data-sort-value="0.87" | 870 m || 
|-id=629 bgcolor=#fefefe
| 359629 ||  || — || December 21, 2008 || Kitt Peak || Spacewatch || NYS || align=right data-sort-value="0.61" | 610 m || 
|-id=630 bgcolor=#E9E9E9
| 359630 ||  || — || September 18, 2007 || Kitt Peak || Spacewatch || — || align=right data-sort-value="0.91" | 910 m || 
|-id=631 bgcolor=#fefefe
| 359631 ||  || — || September 28, 1997 || Kitt Peak || Spacewatch || — || align=right data-sort-value="0.83" | 830 m || 
|-id=632 bgcolor=#fefefe
| 359632 ||  || — || March 13, 2010 || Mount Lemmon || Mount Lemmon Survey || — || align=right data-sort-value="0.80" | 800 m || 
|-id=633 bgcolor=#fefefe
| 359633 ||  || — || June 27, 2011 || Mount Lemmon || Mount Lemmon Survey || — || align=right | 1.0 km || 
|-id=634 bgcolor=#fefefe
| 359634 ||  || — || September 7, 2008 || Mount Lemmon || Mount Lemmon Survey || — || align=right data-sort-value="0.72" | 720 m || 
|-id=635 bgcolor=#fefefe
| 359635 ||  || — || February 1, 2006 || Mount Lemmon || Mount Lemmon Survey || V || align=right data-sort-value="0.67" | 670 m || 
|-id=636 bgcolor=#fefefe
| 359636 ||  || — || December 29, 2005 || Socorro || LINEAR || FLO || align=right data-sort-value="0.67" | 670 m || 
|-id=637 bgcolor=#fefefe
| 359637 ||  || — || June 13, 2011 || Mount Lemmon || Mount Lemmon Survey || — || align=right | 1.1 km || 
|-id=638 bgcolor=#fefefe
| 359638 ||  || — || October 30, 2008 || Mount Lemmon || Mount Lemmon Survey || — || align=right data-sort-value="0.88" | 880 m || 
|-id=639 bgcolor=#fefefe
| 359639 ||  || — || April 25, 2007 || Kitt Peak || Spacewatch || — || align=right data-sort-value="0.95" | 950 m || 
|-id=640 bgcolor=#fefefe
| 359640 ||  || — || August 24, 2011 || La Sagra || OAM Obs. || H || align=right | 1.0 km || 
|-id=641 bgcolor=#fefefe
| 359641 ||  || — || September 10, 2004 || Socorro || LINEAR || — || align=right data-sort-value="0.79" | 790 m || 
|-id=642 bgcolor=#fefefe
| 359642 ||  || — || March 20, 1999 || Apache Point || SDSS || FLO || align=right data-sort-value="0.69" | 690 m || 
|-id=643 bgcolor=#fefefe
| 359643 ||  || — || October 5, 2004 || Kitt Peak || Spacewatch || — || align=right data-sort-value="0.67" | 670 m || 
|-id=644 bgcolor=#fefefe
| 359644 ||  || — || November 21, 2000 || Socorro || LINEAR || NYS || align=right data-sort-value="0.85" | 850 m || 
|-id=645 bgcolor=#fefefe
| 359645 ||  || — || March 29, 2000 || Kitt Peak || Spacewatch || FLO || align=right data-sort-value="0.71" | 710 m || 
|-id=646 bgcolor=#fefefe
| 359646 ||  || — || January 16, 2009 || Mount Lemmon || Mount Lemmon Survey || NYS || align=right data-sort-value="0.55" | 550 m || 
|-id=647 bgcolor=#fefefe
| 359647 ||  || — || September 24, 2008 || Mount Lemmon || Mount Lemmon Survey || — || align=right data-sort-value="0.69" | 690 m || 
|-id=648 bgcolor=#E9E9E9
| 359648 ||  || — || December 18, 2003 || Kitt Peak || Spacewatch || — || align=right | 1.4 km || 
|-id=649 bgcolor=#fefefe
| 359649 ||  || — || September 18, 2004 || Socorro || LINEAR || — || align=right data-sort-value="0.93" | 930 m || 
|-id=650 bgcolor=#fefefe
| 359650 ||  || — || November 2, 2004 || Anderson Mesa || LONEOS || — || align=right data-sort-value="0.92" | 920 m || 
|-id=651 bgcolor=#fefefe
| 359651 ||  || — || October 4, 2004 || Kitt Peak || Spacewatch || V || align=right data-sort-value="0.61" | 610 m || 
|-id=652 bgcolor=#fefefe
| 359652 ||  || — || September 23, 2000 || Socorro || LINEAR || V || align=right data-sort-value="0.75" | 750 m || 
|-id=653 bgcolor=#E9E9E9
| 359653 ||  || — || September 24, 1960 || Palomar || L. D. Schmadel, R. M. Stoss || — || align=right | 2.3 km || 
|-id=654 bgcolor=#fefefe
| 359654 ||  || — || February 9, 2006 || Palomar || NEAT || V || align=right data-sort-value="0.78" | 780 m || 
|-id=655 bgcolor=#fefefe
| 359655 ||  || — || September 12, 1998 || Kitt Peak || Spacewatch || — || align=right data-sort-value="0.90" | 900 m || 
|-id=656 bgcolor=#d6d6d6
| 359656 ||  || — || March 12, 2008 || Kitt Peak || Spacewatch || — || align=right | 3.6 km || 
|-id=657 bgcolor=#fefefe
| 359657 ||  || — || December 6, 2005 || Mount Lemmon || Mount Lemmon Survey || — || align=right data-sort-value="0.88" | 880 m || 
|-id=658 bgcolor=#E9E9E9
| 359658 ||  || — || October 29, 2003 || Kitt Peak || Spacewatch || — || align=right data-sort-value="0.68" | 680 m || 
|-id=659 bgcolor=#fefefe
| 359659 ||  || — || September 22, 2008 || Mount Lemmon || Mount Lemmon Survey || FLO || align=right data-sort-value="0.70" | 700 m || 
|-id=660 bgcolor=#fefefe
| 359660 ||  || — || December 5, 2008 || Mount Lemmon || Mount Lemmon Survey || — || align=right | 1.2 km || 
|-id=661 bgcolor=#fefefe
| 359661 ||  || — || August 13, 2007 || Socorro || LINEAR || — || align=right | 1.1 km || 
|-id=662 bgcolor=#fefefe
| 359662 ||  || — || November 4, 1996 || Kitt Peak || Spacewatch || V || align=right data-sort-value="0.89" | 890 m || 
|-id=663 bgcolor=#d6d6d6
| 359663 ||  || — || September 20, 2011 || Mount Lemmon || Mount Lemmon Survey || — || align=right | 3.9 km || 
|-id=664 bgcolor=#E9E9E9
| 359664 ||  || — || September 22, 2003 || Palomar || NEAT || — || align=right data-sort-value="0.87" | 870 m || 
|-id=665 bgcolor=#E9E9E9
| 359665 ||  || — || March 12, 2005 || Kitt Peak || Spacewatch || ADE || align=right | 2.0 km || 
|-id=666 bgcolor=#E9E9E9
| 359666 ||  || — || March 3, 2009 || Kitt Peak || Spacewatch || — || align=right | 1.4 km || 
|-id=667 bgcolor=#E9E9E9
| 359667 ||  || — || December 22, 2003 || Kitt Peak || Spacewatch || — || align=right | 1.3 km || 
|-id=668 bgcolor=#E9E9E9
| 359668 ||  || — || March 11, 2005 || Mount Lemmon || Mount Lemmon Survey || MAR || align=right data-sort-value="0.88" | 880 m || 
|-id=669 bgcolor=#E9E9E9
| 359669 ||  || — || December 15, 2007 || Mount Lemmon || Mount Lemmon Survey || — || align=right | 2.1 km || 
|-id=670 bgcolor=#d6d6d6
| 359670 ||  || — || December 17, 2001 || Socorro || LINEAR || — || align=right | 3.9 km || 
|-id=671 bgcolor=#fefefe
| 359671 ||  || — || November 27, 2000 || Kitt Peak || Spacewatch || MAS || align=right data-sort-value="0.94" | 940 m || 
|-id=672 bgcolor=#E9E9E9
| 359672 ||  || — || October 19, 2007 || Catalina || CSS || — || align=right | 1.5 km || 
|-id=673 bgcolor=#fefefe
| 359673 ||  || — || March 24, 2006 || Kitt Peak || Spacewatch || — || align=right | 1.1 km || 
|-id=674 bgcolor=#E9E9E9
| 359674 ||  || — || March 21, 2009 || Mount Lemmon || Mount Lemmon Survey || — || align=right | 2.4 km || 
|-id=675 bgcolor=#d6d6d6
| 359675 ||  || — || April 6, 2008 || Mount Lemmon || Mount Lemmon Survey || TIR || align=right | 3.4 km || 
|-id=676 bgcolor=#fefefe
| 359676 ||  || — || September 24, 2000 || Socorro || LINEAR || — || align=right | 1.1 km || 
|-id=677 bgcolor=#fefefe
| 359677 ||  || — || October 16, 2001 || Socorro || LINEAR || — || align=right data-sort-value="0.98" | 980 m || 
|-id=678 bgcolor=#E9E9E9
| 359678 ||  || — || March 21, 2009 || Mount Lemmon || Mount Lemmon Survey || AGN || align=right | 1.2 km || 
|-id=679 bgcolor=#fefefe
| 359679 ||  || — || November 1, 2008 || Mount Lemmon || Mount Lemmon Survey || — || align=right data-sort-value="0.67" | 670 m || 
|-id=680 bgcolor=#E9E9E9
| 359680 ||  || — || April 2, 2009 || Kitt Peak || Spacewatch || ADE || align=right | 2.0 km || 
|-id=681 bgcolor=#E9E9E9
| 359681 ||  || — || September 8, 2007 || Mount Lemmon || Mount Lemmon Survey || — || align=right data-sort-value="0.89" | 890 m || 
|-id=682 bgcolor=#fefefe
| 359682 ||  || — || January 20, 2009 || Mount Lemmon || Mount Lemmon Survey || FLO || align=right data-sort-value="0.62" | 620 m || 
|-id=683 bgcolor=#fefefe
| 359683 ||  || — || April 9, 2010 || Kitt Peak || Spacewatch || — || align=right | 1.0 km || 
|-id=684 bgcolor=#E9E9E9
| 359684 ||  || — || November 30, 2003 || Kitt Peak || Spacewatch || — || align=right | 1.2 km || 
|-id=685 bgcolor=#fefefe
| 359685 ||  || — || August 23, 2004 || Kitt Peak || Spacewatch || — || align=right data-sort-value="0.64" | 640 m || 
|-id=686 bgcolor=#fefefe
| 359686 ||  || — || February 4, 2000 || Kitt Peak || Spacewatch || — || align=right data-sort-value="0.62" | 620 m || 
|-id=687 bgcolor=#E9E9E9
| 359687 ||  || — || August 19, 2006 || Kitt Peak || Spacewatch || HEN || align=right data-sort-value="0.99" | 990 m || 
|-id=688 bgcolor=#E9E9E9
| 359688 ||  || — || December 14, 2007 || Mount Lemmon || Mount Lemmon Survey || XIZ || align=right | 1.4 km || 
|-id=689 bgcolor=#d6d6d6
| 359689 ||  || — || September 16, 2010 || Mount Lemmon || Mount Lemmon Survey || EOS || align=right | 2.6 km || 
|-id=690 bgcolor=#E9E9E9
| 359690 ||  || — || August 21, 2006 || Kitt Peak || Spacewatch || AGN || align=right | 1.1 km || 
|-id=691 bgcolor=#d6d6d6
| 359691 ||  || — || September 18, 2006 || Kitt Peak || Spacewatch || BRA || align=right | 1.5 km || 
|-id=692 bgcolor=#E9E9E9
| 359692 ||  || — || December 18, 2007 || Kitt Peak || Spacewatch || — || align=right | 2.1 km || 
|-id=693 bgcolor=#E9E9E9
| 359693 ||  || — || September 9, 2002 || Campo Imperatore || CINEOS || — || align=right | 1.8 km || 
|-id=694 bgcolor=#E9E9E9
| 359694 ||  || — || November 26, 2003 || Kitt Peak || Spacewatch || — || align=right data-sort-value="0.91" | 910 m || 
|-id=695 bgcolor=#fefefe
| 359695 ||  || — || April 10, 2003 || Kitt Peak || Spacewatch || — || align=right | 1.0 km || 
|-id=696 bgcolor=#E9E9E9
| 359696 ||  || — || February 1, 2009 || Kitt Peak || Spacewatch || — || align=right | 1.7 km || 
|-id=697 bgcolor=#fefefe
| 359697 ||  || — || December 29, 2008 || Kitt Peak || Spacewatch || MAS || align=right data-sort-value="0.77" | 770 m || 
|-id=698 bgcolor=#fefefe
| 359698 ||  || — || March 21, 2002 || Kitt Peak || Spacewatch || — || align=right data-sort-value="0.94" | 940 m || 
|-id=699 bgcolor=#fefefe
| 359699 ||  || — || September 9, 2004 || Socorro || LINEAR || — || align=right data-sort-value="0.80" | 800 m || 
|-id=700 bgcolor=#E9E9E9
| 359700 ||  || — || October 10, 2007 || Catalina || CSS || MAR || align=right | 1.3 km || 
|}

359701–359800 

|-bgcolor=#fefefe
| 359701 ||  || — || July 8, 2004 || Siding Spring || SSS || — || align=right data-sort-value="0.89" | 890 m || 
|-id=702 bgcolor=#E9E9E9
| 359702 ||  || — || February 1, 2009 || Kitt Peak || Spacewatch || KON || align=right | 3.1 km || 
|-id=703 bgcolor=#d6d6d6
| 359703 ||  || — || November 16, 2006 || Kitt Peak || Spacewatch || THM || align=right | 2.1 km || 
|-id=704 bgcolor=#E9E9E9
| 359704 ||  || — || December 5, 2002 || Socorro || LINEAR || — || align=right | 2.6 km || 
|-id=705 bgcolor=#d6d6d6
| 359705 ||  || — || December 21, 2006 || Kitt Peak || Spacewatch || — || align=right | 3.7 km || 
|-id=706 bgcolor=#fefefe
| 359706 ||  || — || February 25, 2006 || Kitt Peak || Spacewatch || FLO || align=right data-sort-value="0.58" | 580 m || 
|-id=707 bgcolor=#E9E9E9
| 359707 ||  || — || October 3, 2002 || Palomar || NEAT || — || align=right | 2.6 km || 
|-id=708 bgcolor=#fefefe
| 359708 ||  || — || September 19, 2001 || Socorro || LINEAR || — || align=right data-sort-value="0.88" | 880 m || 
|-id=709 bgcolor=#d6d6d6
| 359709 ||  || — || November 2, 2006 || Mount Lemmon || Mount Lemmon Survey || — || align=right | 2.4 km || 
|-id=710 bgcolor=#fefefe
| 359710 ||  || — || December 24, 2005 || Kitt Peak || Spacewatch || — || align=right data-sort-value="0.71" | 710 m || 
|-id=711 bgcolor=#d6d6d6
| 359711 ||  || — || December 13, 2006 || Catalina || CSS || — || align=right | 3.5 km || 
|-id=712 bgcolor=#fefefe
| 359712 ||  || — || September 8, 2008 || Siding Spring || SSS || H || align=right | 1.0 km || 
|-id=713 bgcolor=#fefefe
| 359713 ||  || — || September 16, 2004 || Kitt Peak || Spacewatch || — || align=right | 1.1 km || 
|-id=714 bgcolor=#fefefe
| 359714 ||  || — || January 15, 1996 || Kitt Peak || Spacewatch || — || align=right data-sort-value="0.78" | 780 m || 
|-id=715 bgcolor=#E9E9E9
| 359715 ||  || — || March 18, 2009 || Kitt Peak || Spacewatch || MAR || align=right | 1.3 km || 
|-id=716 bgcolor=#d6d6d6
| 359716 ||  || — || September 29, 2005 || Kitt Peak || Spacewatch || HYG || align=right | 3.2 km || 
|-id=717 bgcolor=#d6d6d6
| 359717 ||  || — || February 13, 2008 || Catalina || CSS || — || align=right | 4.5 km || 
|-id=718 bgcolor=#E9E9E9
| 359718 ||  || — || September 15, 2002 || Palomar || NEAT || — || align=right | 1.7 km || 
|-id=719 bgcolor=#E9E9E9
| 359719 ||  || — || April 2, 2005 || Mount Lemmon || Mount Lemmon Survey || — || align=right | 1.7 km || 
|-id=720 bgcolor=#fefefe
| 359720 ||  || — || November 11, 2004 || Kitt Peak || Spacewatch || — || align=right | 1.2 km || 
|-id=721 bgcolor=#E9E9E9
| 359721 ||  || — || March 27, 2004 || Catalina || CSS || — || align=right | 2.7 km || 
|-id=722 bgcolor=#fefefe
| 359722 ||  || — || April 9, 2010 || Mount Lemmon || Mount Lemmon Survey || — || align=right | 2.5 km || 
|-id=723 bgcolor=#E9E9E9
| 359723 ||  || — || December 19, 2007 || Mount Lemmon || Mount Lemmon Survey || HNA || align=right | 2.6 km || 
|-id=724 bgcolor=#fefefe
| 359724 ||  || — || July 18, 2007 || La Sagra || OAM Obs. || — || align=right | 1.1 km || 
|-id=725 bgcolor=#E9E9E9
| 359725 ||  || — || December 5, 2007 || Kitt Peak || Spacewatch || — || align=right | 2.2 km || 
|-id=726 bgcolor=#E9E9E9
| 359726 ||  || — || September 19, 2006 || Catalina || CSS || — || align=right | 2.5 km || 
|-id=727 bgcolor=#E9E9E9
| 359727 ||  || — || April 1, 2009 || Kitt Peak || Spacewatch || — || align=right | 3.3 km || 
|-id=728 bgcolor=#fefefe
| 359728 ||  || — || March 3, 2000 || Socorro || LINEAR || — || align=right data-sort-value="0.80" | 800 m || 
|-id=729 bgcolor=#d6d6d6
| 359729 ||  || — || October 7, 2005 || Mount Lemmon || Mount Lemmon Survey || — || align=right | 4.0 km || 
|-id=730 bgcolor=#E9E9E9
| 359730 ||  || — || December 31, 2007 || Kitt Peak || Spacewatch || XIZ || align=right | 1.4 km || 
|-id=731 bgcolor=#E9E9E9
| 359731 ||  || — || June 18, 2010 || Mount Lemmon || Mount Lemmon Survey || HEN || align=right | 1.1 km || 
|-id=732 bgcolor=#E9E9E9
| 359732 ||  || — || December 18, 2007 || Mount Lemmon || Mount Lemmon Survey || HOF || align=right | 2.9 km || 
|-id=733 bgcolor=#fefefe
| 359733 ||  || — || June 1, 2010 || Nogales || M. Schwartz, P. R. Holvorcem || FLO || align=right data-sort-value="0.85" | 850 m || 
|-id=734 bgcolor=#E9E9E9
| 359734 ||  || — || October 1, 1998 || Kitt Peak || Spacewatch || — || align=right | 1.3 km || 
|-id=735 bgcolor=#fefefe
| 359735 ||  || — || April 11, 2002 || Palomar || NEAT || CIM || align=right | 1.8 km || 
|-id=736 bgcolor=#E9E9E9
| 359736 ||  || — || April 11, 2005 || Mount Lemmon || Mount Lemmon Survey || — || align=right | 1.7 km || 
|-id=737 bgcolor=#E9E9E9
| 359737 ||  || — || November 4, 2002 || Palomar || NEAT || — || align=right | 2.1 km || 
|-id=738 bgcolor=#E9E9E9
| 359738 ||  || — || January 16, 2004 || Palomar || NEAT || — || align=right | 3.0 km || 
|-id=739 bgcolor=#E9E9E9
| 359739 ||  || — || April 20, 2009 || Mount Lemmon || Mount Lemmon Survey || — || align=right | 1.5 km || 
|-id=740 bgcolor=#E9E9E9
| 359740 ||  || — || April 6, 2005 || Mount Lemmon || Mount Lemmon Survey || — || align=right | 1.7 km || 
|-id=741 bgcolor=#d6d6d6
| 359741 ||  || — || May 30, 2010 || WISE || WISE || — || align=right | 3.7 km || 
|-id=742 bgcolor=#E9E9E9
| 359742 ||  || — || March 16, 2004 || Kitt Peak || Spacewatch || — || align=right | 2.8 km || 
|-id=743 bgcolor=#fefefe
| 359743 ||  || — || May 7, 2010 || Mount Lemmon || Mount Lemmon Survey || FLO || align=right data-sort-value="0.60" | 600 m || 
|-id=744 bgcolor=#E9E9E9
| 359744 ||  || — || November 5, 2007 || Mount Lemmon || Mount Lemmon Survey || — || align=right | 1.5 km || 
|-id=745 bgcolor=#fefefe
| 359745 ||  || — || March 20, 1999 || Apache Point || SDSS || V || align=right data-sort-value="0.72" | 720 m || 
|-id=746 bgcolor=#E9E9E9
| 359746 ||  || — || October 14, 2007 || Mount Lemmon || Mount Lemmon Survey || EUN || align=right | 1.1 km || 
|-id=747 bgcolor=#E9E9E9
| 359747 ||  || — || September 15, 2007 || Mount Lemmon || Mount Lemmon Survey || — || align=right data-sort-value="0.91" | 910 m || 
|-id=748 bgcolor=#d6d6d6
| 359748 ||  || — || February 28, 2008 || Mount Lemmon || Mount Lemmon Survey || — || align=right | 2.6 km || 
|-id=749 bgcolor=#E9E9E9
| 359749 ||  || — || December 21, 2003 || Kitt Peak || Spacewatch || — || align=right | 1.6 km || 
|-id=750 bgcolor=#E9E9E9
| 359750 ||  || — || September 30, 2006 || Kitt Peak || Spacewatch || HOF || align=right | 2.8 km || 
|-id=751 bgcolor=#fefefe
| 359751 ||  || — || January 8, 2005 || Socorro || LINEAR || ERI || align=right | 1.9 km || 
|-id=752 bgcolor=#E9E9E9
| 359752 ||  || — || August 20, 2002 || Palomar || NEAT || — || align=right | 1.7 km || 
|-id=753 bgcolor=#d6d6d6
| 359753 ||  || — || May 1, 2003 || Kitt Peak || Spacewatch || EOS || align=right | 1.8 km || 
|-id=754 bgcolor=#E9E9E9
| 359754 ||  || — || August 10, 2002 || Cerro Tololo || M. W. Buie || — || align=right | 1.3 km || 
|-id=755 bgcolor=#fefefe
| 359755 ||  || — || October 21, 2007 || Mount Lemmon || Mount Lemmon Survey || — || align=right | 3.9 km || 
|-id=756 bgcolor=#fefefe
| 359756 ||  || — || September 19, 2003 || Kitt Peak || Spacewatch || V || align=right data-sort-value="0.98" | 980 m || 
|-id=757 bgcolor=#d6d6d6
| 359757 ||  || — || May 22, 2010 || WISE || WISE || — || align=right | 4.5 km || 
|-id=758 bgcolor=#d6d6d6
| 359758 ||  || — || October 6, 2000 || Haleakala || NEAT || EMA || align=right | 3.4 km || 
|-id=759 bgcolor=#E9E9E9
| 359759 ||  || — || August 19, 2006 || Kitt Peak || Spacewatch || — || align=right | 1.9 km || 
|-id=760 bgcolor=#d6d6d6
| 359760 ||  || — || April 22, 2009 || Mount Lemmon || Mount Lemmon Survey || fast? || align=right | 3.6 km || 
|-id=761 bgcolor=#fefefe
| 359761 ||  || — || April 2, 2006 || Kitt Peak || Spacewatch || — || align=right data-sort-value="0.99" | 990 m || 
|-id=762 bgcolor=#E9E9E9
| 359762 ||  || — || December 5, 2007 || Catalina || CSS || — || align=right | 2.0 km || 
|-id=763 bgcolor=#fefefe
| 359763 ||  || — || May 9, 2006 || Mount Lemmon || Mount Lemmon Survey || — || align=right | 1.3 km || 
|-id=764 bgcolor=#d6d6d6
| 359764 ||  || — || January 8, 2007 || Mount Lemmon || Mount Lemmon Survey || THM || align=right | 2.1 km || 
|-id=765 bgcolor=#E9E9E9
| 359765 ||  || — || November 1, 2007 || Kitt Peak || Spacewatch || — || align=right | 1.4 km || 
|-id=766 bgcolor=#fefefe
| 359766 ||  || — || October 23, 2001 || Socorro || LINEAR || — || align=right data-sort-value="0.93" | 930 m || 
|-id=767 bgcolor=#E9E9E9
| 359767 ||  || — || February 20, 2009 || Mount Lemmon || Mount Lemmon Survey || — || align=right | 1.6 km || 
|-id=768 bgcolor=#fefefe
| 359768 ||  || — || July 9, 2004 || Socorro || LINEAR || — || align=right data-sort-value="0.81" | 810 m || 
|-id=769 bgcolor=#E9E9E9
| 359769 ||  || — || October 21, 2007 || Mount Lemmon || Mount Lemmon Survey || — || align=right | 1.0 km || 
|-id=770 bgcolor=#E9E9E9
| 359770 ||  || — || October 2, 2006 || Mount Lemmon || Mount Lemmon Survey || — || align=right | 2.3 km || 
|-id=771 bgcolor=#E9E9E9
| 359771 ||  || — || September 1, 2006 || Wrightwood || J. W. Young || WIT || align=right | 1.1 km || 
|-id=772 bgcolor=#fefefe
| 359772 ||  || — || October 29, 2005 || Catalina || CSS || — || align=right data-sort-value="0.74" | 740 m || 
|-id=773 bgcolor=#fefefe
| 359773 ||  || — || December 30, 2008 || Mount Lemmon || Mount Lemmon Survey || — || align=right data-sort-value="0.81" | 810 m || 
|-id=774 bgcolor=#E9E9E9
| 359774 ||  || — || May 11, 2005 || Palomar || NEAT || — || align=right | 2.3 km || 
|-id=775 bgcolor=#d6d6d6
| 359775 ||  || — || December 14, 2006 || Palomar || NEAT || — || align=right | 4.0 km || 
|-id=776 bgcolor=#E9E9E9
| 359776 ||  || — || December 18, 2007 || Mount Lemmon || Mount Lemmon Survey || WIT || align=right | 1.1 km || 
|-id=777 bgcolor=#d6d6d6
| 359777 ||  || — || April 18, 2010 || WISE || WISE || EMA || align=right | 4.3 km || 
|-id=778 bgcolor=#d6d6d6
| 359778 ||  || — || January 30, 2008 || Mount Lemmon || Mount Lemmon Survey || — || align=right | 2.7 km || 
|-id=779 bgcolor=#E9E9E9
| 359779 ||  || — || March 17, 2004 || Kitt Peak || Spacewatch || NEM || align=right | 2.1 km || 
|-id=780 bgcolor=#E9E9E9
| 359780 ||  || — || August 29, 2006 || Kitt Peak || Spacewatch || AEO || align=right | 1.2 km || 
|-id=781 bgcolor=#d6d6d6
| 359781 ||  || — || May 30, 2009 || Mount Lemmon || Mount Lemmon Survey || CRO || align=right | 3.2 km || 
|-id=782 bgcolor=#E9E9E9
| 359782 ||  || — || November 16, 2002 || Palomar || NEAT || HOF || align=right | 3.1 km || 
|-id=783 bgcolor=#d6d6d6
| 359783 ||  || — || August 29, 2005 || Palomar || NEAT || — || align=right | 3.7 km || 
|-id=784 bgcolor=#E9E9E9
| 359784 ||  || — || November 11, 2007 || Mount Lemmon || Mount Lemmon Survey || — || align=right | 1.7 km || 
|-id=785 bgcolor=#d6d6d6
| 359785 ||  || — || March 24, 2003 || Kitt Peak || Spacewatch || — || align=right | 4.0 km || 
|-id=786 bgcolor=#fefefe
| 359786 ||  || — || October 3, 2003 || Kitt Peak || Spacewatch || V || align=right data-sort-value="0.89" | 890 m || 
|-id=787 bgcolor=#E9E9E9
| 359787 ||  || — || September 25, 2006 || Kitt Peak || Spacewatch || — || align=right | 2.0 km || 
|-id=788 bgcolor=#E9E9E9
| 359788 ||  || — || May 4, 2005 || Mount Lemmon || Mount Lemmon Survey || — || align=right | 1.3 km || 
|-id=789 bgcolor=#E9E9E9
| 359789 ||  || — || December 15, 2007 || Mount Lemmon || Mount Lemmon Survey || WIT || align=right | 1.0 km || 
|-id=790 bgcolor=#d6d6d6
| 359790 ||  || — || November 17, 2006 || Catalina || CSS || — || align=right | 3.6 km || 
|-id=791 bgcolor=#fefefe
| 359791 ||  || — || December 7, 2008 || Mount Lemmon || Mount Lemmon Survey || V || align=right data-sort-value="0.81" | 810 m || 
|-id=792 bgcolor=#E9E9E9
| 359792 ||  || — || August 28, 2006 || Kitt Peak || Spacewatch || — || align=right | 1.6 km || 
|-id=793 bgcolor=#E9E9E9
| 359793 ||  || — || October 6, 2002 || Palomar || NEAT || PAD || align=right | 1.7 km || 
|-id=794 bgcolor=#E9E9E9
| 359794 ||  || — || August 28, 2006 || Kitt Peak || Spacewatch || — || align=right | 1.8 km || 
|-id=795 bgcolor=#E9E9E9
| 359795 ||  || — || October 4, 2006 || Mount Lemmon || Mount Lemmon Survey || — || align=right | 2.3 km || 
|-id=796 bgcolor=#fefefe
| 359796 ||  || — || March 23, 2006 || Mount Lemmon || Mount Lemmon Survey || — || align=right | 1.0 km || 
|-id=797 bgcolor=#d6d6d6
| 359797 ||  || — || June 10, 2010 || WISE || WISE || URS || align=right | 3.0 km || 
|-id=798 bgcolor=#fefefe
| 359798 ||  || — || January 12, 2002 || Kitt Peak || Spacewatch || FLO || align=right data-sort-value="0.64" | 640 m || 
|-id=799 bgcolor=#E9E9E9
| 359799 ||  || — || September 26, 2006 || Kitt Peak || Spacewatch || HOF || align=right | 2.1 km || 
|-id=800 bgcolor=#fefefe
| 359800 ||  || — || April 8, 2002 || Palomar || NEAT || — || align=right | 1.0 km || 
|}

359801–359900 

|-bgcolor=#fefefe
| 359801 ||  || — || November 4, 2004 || Catalina || CSS || — || align=right data-sort-value="0.86" | 860 m || 
|-id=802 bgcolor=#E9E9E9
| 359802 ||  || — || October 11, 2006 || Kitt Peak || Spacewatch || WIT || align=right | 1.0 km || 
|-id=803 bgcolor=#fefefe
| 359803 ||  || — || September 13, 2007 || Mount Lemmon || Mount Lemmon Survey || — || align=right data-sort-value="0.96" | 960 m || 
|-id=804 bgcolor=#fefefe
| 359804 ||  || — || October 9, 2004 || Kitt Peak || Spacewatch || FLO || align=right data-sort-value="0.84" | 840 m || 
|-id=805 bgcolor=#d6d6d6
| 359805 ||  || — || April 25, 2003 || Kitt Peak || Spacewatch || — || align=right | 2.8 km || 
|-id=806 bgcolor=#d6d6d6
| 359806 ||  || — || December 17, 2001 || Socorro || LINEAR || — || align=right | 2.1 km || 
|-id=807 bgcolor=#fefefe
| 359807 ||  || — || February 7, 2002 || Kitt Peak || Spacewatch || NYS || align=right data-sort-value="0.85" | 850 m || 
|-id=808 bgcolor=#E9E9E9
| 359808 ||  || — || May 4, 2009 || Mount Lemmon || Mount Lemmon Survey || — || align=right | 1.1 km || 
|-id=809 bgcolor=#E9E9E9
| 359809 ||  || — || February 12, 2004 || Kitt Peak || Spacewatch || — || align=right | 1.3 km || 
|-id=810 bgcolor=#fefefe
| 359810 ||  || — || September 25, 2007 || Mount Lemmon || Mount Lemmon Survey || — || align=right data-sort-value="0.85" | 850 m || 
|-id=811 bgcolor=#E9E9E9
| 359811 ||  || — || December 15, 2007 || Socorro || LINEAR || EUN || align=right | 1.6 km || 
|-id=812 bgcolor=#E9E9E9
| 359812 ||  || — || January 19, 2004 || Anderson Mesa || LONEOS || — || align=right | 1.7 km || 
|-id=813 bgcolor=#E9E9E9
| 359813 ||  || — || October 18, 2002 || Palomar || NEAT || — || align=right | 1.8 km || 
|-id=814 bgcolor=#E9E9E9
| 359814 ||  || — || September 10, 2002 || Palomar || NEAT || — || align=right | 2.2 km || 
|-id=815 bgcolor=#fefefe
| 359815 ||  || — || November 17, 2001 || Kitt Peak || Spacewatch || — || align=right | 1.1 km || 
|-id=816 bgcolor=#d6d6d6
| 359816 ||  || — || March 11, 2008 || Mount Lemmon || Mount Lemmon Survey || EOS || align=right | 2.2 km || 
|-id=817 bgcolor=#E9E9E9
| 359817 ||  || — || September 25, 2006 || Kitt Peak || Spacewatch || — || align=right | 1.7 km || 
|-id=818 bgcolor=#d6d6d6
| 359818 ||  || — || January 17, 2007 || Mount Lemmon || Mount Lemmon Survey || — || align=right | 3.1 km || 
|-id=819 bgcolor=#E9E9E9
| 359819 ||  || — || October 9, 2002 || Kitt Peak || Spacewatch || — || align=right | 1.8 km || 
|-id=820 bgcolor=#fefefe
| 359820 ||  || — || January 28, 2006 || Kitt Peak || Spacewatch || V || align=right data-sort-value="0.72" | 720 m || 
|-id=821 bgcolor=#E9E9E9
| 359821 ||  || — || January 30, 2004 || Kitt Peak || Spacewatch || HEN || align=right data-sort-value="0.94" | 940 m || 
|-id=822 bgcolor=#d6d6d6
| 359822 ||  || — || September 24, 2011 || Haleakala || Pan-STARRS || — || align=right | 3.0 km || 
|-id=823 bgcolor=#E9E9E9
| 359823 ||  || — || October 12, 1998 || Kitt Peak || Spacewatch || — || align=right | 1.6 km || 
|-id=824 bgcolor=#E9E9E9
| 359824 ||  || — || October 5, 2002 || Palomar || NEAT || — || align=right | 2.8 km || 
|-id=825 bgcolor=#fefefe
| 359825 ||  || — || December 30, 2008 || Kitt Peak || Spacewatch || — || align=right data-sort-value="0.75" | 750 m || 
|-id=826 bgcolor=#E9E9E9
| 359826 ||  || — || August 16, 2002 || Kitt Peak || Spacewatch || — || align=right | 1.8 km || 
|-id=827 bgcolor=#d6d6d6
| 359827 ||  || — || March 31, 2008 || Kitt Peak || Spacewatch || — || align=right | 3.0 km || 
|-id=828 bgcolor=#E9E9E9
| 359828 ||  || — || March 29, 2004 || Kitt Peak || Spacewatch || — || align=right | 2.2 km || 
|-id=829 bgcolor=#d6d6d6
| 359829 ||  || — || January 14, 2002 || Kitt Peak || Spacewatch || THM || align=right | 1.9 km || 
|-id=830 bgcolor=#fefefe
| 359830 ||  || — || November 20, 2001 || Socorro || LINEAR || — || align=right data-sort-value="0.67" | 670 m || 
|-id=831 bgcolor=#E9E9E9
| 359831 ||  || — || February 12, 2004 || Kitt Peak || Spacewatch || — || align=right | 1.4 km || 
|-id=832 bgcolor=#d6d6d6
| 359832 ||  || — || November 25, 2006 || Kitt Peak || Spacewatch || — || align=right | 4.0 km || 
|-id=833 bgcolor=#E9E9E9
| 359833 ||  || — || October 16, 2007 || Catalina || CSS || — || align=right | 1.5 km || 
|-id=834 bgcolor=#E9E9E9
| 359834 ||  || — || December 29, 2003 || Kitt Peak || Spacewatch || — || align=right | 2.2 km || 
|-id=835 bgcolor=#E9E9E9
| 359835 ||  || — || September 25, 2006 || Mount Lemmon || Mount Lemmon Survey || HNA || align=right | 2.2 km || 
|-id=836 bgcolor=#E9E9E9
| 359836 ||  || — || February 15, 2004 || Catalina || CSS || — || align=right | 1.8 km || 
|-id=837 bgcolor=#fefefe
| 359837 ||  || — || March 27, 2003 || Kitt Peak || Spacewatch || V || align=right data-sort-value="0.72" | 720 m || 
|-id=838 bgcolor=#d6d6d6
| 359838 ||  || — || September 29, 1995 || Kitt Peak || Spacewatch || — || align=right | 2.8 km || 
|-id=839 bgcolor=#d6d6d6
| 359839 ||  || — || October 3, 2006 || Mount Lemmon || Mount Lemmon Survey || — || align=right | 2.3 km || 
|-id=840 bgcolor=#d6d6d6
| 359840 ||  || — || September 17, 2006 || Kitt Peak || Spacewatch || KAR || align=right data-sort-value="0.89" | 890 m || 
|-id=841 bgcolor=#d6d6d6
| 359841 ||  || — || March 10, 2008 || Kitt Peak || Spacewatch || — || align=right | 2.6 km || 
|-id=842 bgcolor=#E9E9E9
| 359842 ||  || — || March 23, 2004 || Kitt Peak || Spacewatch || — || align=right | 1.6 km || 
|-id=843 bgcolor=#fefefe
| 359843 ||  || — || January 28, 2009 || Catalina || CSS || V || align=right data-sort-value="0.73" | 730 m || 
|-id=844 bgcolor=#d6d6d6
| 359844 ||  || — || December 25, 1995 || Kitt Peak || Spacewatch || — || align=right | 3.1 km || 
|-id=845 bgcolor=#d6d6d6
| 359845 ||  || — || December 13, 2006 || Mount Lemmon || Mount Lemmon Survey || — || align=right | 2.3 km || 
|-id=846 bgcolor=#d6d6d6
| 359846 ||  || — || February 26, 2003 || Campo Imperatore || CINEOS || — || align=right | 2.3 km || 
|-id=847 bgcolor=#E9E9E9
| 359847 ||  || — || September 28, 2011 || Nizhny Arkhyz || V. Gerke, A. Novichonok || PAD || align=right | 1.9 km || 
|-id=848 bgcolor=#d6d6d6
| 359848 ||  || — || October 21, 2006 || Mount Lemmon || Mount Lemmon Survey || — || align=right | 2.2 km || 
|-id=849 bgcolor=#fefefe
| 359849 ||  || — || January 18, 2009 || Catalina || CSS || V || align=right data-sort-value="0.91" | 910 m || 
|-id=850 bgcolor=#E9E9E9
| 359850 ||  || — || August 21, 2006 || Kitt Peak || Spacewatch || AGN || align=right | 1.3 km || 
|-id=851 bgcolor=#E9E9E9
| 359851 ||  || — || February 27, 2009 || Kitt Peak || Spacewatch || — || align=right | 1.2 km || 
|-id=852 bgcolor=#d6d6d6
| 359852 ||  || — || August 29, 2005 || Kitt Peak || Spacewatch || LIX || align=right | 3.7 km || 
|-id=853 bgcolor=#d6d6d6
| 359853 ||  || — || March 27, 2003 || Kitt Peak || Spacewatch || EOS || align=right | 2.6 km || 
|-id=854 bgcolor=#E9E9E9
| 359854 ||  || — || August 21, 2006 || Kitt Peak || Spacewatch || NEM || align=right | 2.1 km || 
|-id=855 bgcolor=#E9E9E9
| 359855 ||  || — || August 29, 2006 || Kitt Peak || Spacewatch || — || align=right | 2.4 km || 
|-id=856 bgcolor=#E9E9E9
| 359856 ||  || — || October 23, 2006 || Mount Lemmon || Mount Lemmon Survey || PAD || align=right | 1.5 km || 
|-id=857 bgcolor=#E9E9E9
| 359857 ||  || — || December 5, 2007 || Kitt Peak || Spacewatch || — || align=right | 2.3 km || 
|-id=858 bgcolor=#d6d6d6
| 359858 ||  || — || October 20, 2003 || Kitt Peak || Spacewatch || 3:2 || align=right | 3.4 km || 
|-id=859 bgcolor=#E9E9E9
| 359859 ||  || — || January 15, 1996 || Kitt Peak || Spacewatch || — || align=right | 1.2 km || 
|-id=860 bgcolor=#d6d6d6
| 359860 ||  || — || November 25, 2006 || Kitt Peak || Spacewatch || EOS || align=right | 2.0 km || 
|-id=861 bgcolor=#E9E9E9
| 359861 ||  || — || December 31, 2007 || Catalina || CSS || HNS || align=right | 1.8 km || 
|-id=862 bgcolor=#d6d6d6
| 359862 ||  || — || August 26, 2005 || Palomar || NEAT || — || align=right | 3.1 km || 
|-id=863 bgcolor=#d6d6d6
| 359863 ||  || — || February 12, 2008 || Mount Lemmon || Mount Lemmon Survey || — || align=right | 3.2 km || 
|-id=864 bgcolor=#E9E9E9
| 359864 ||  || — || October 21, 2006 || Mount Lemmon || Mount Lemmon Survey || — || align=right | 2.2 km || 
|-id=865 bgcolor=#fefefe
| 359865 ||  || — || October 16, 2003 || Kitt Peak || Spacewatch || — || align=right | 1.1 km || 
|-id=866 bgcolor=#fefefe
| 359866 ||  || — || January 28, 2006 || Kitt Peak || Spacewatch || — || align=right data-sort-value="0.84" | 840 m || 
|-id=867 bgcolor=#E9E9E9
| 359867 ||  || — || April 11, 2005 || Kitt Peak || Spacewatch || — || align=right | 1.8 km || 
|-id=868 bgcolor=#fefefe
| 359868 ||  || — || March 26, 2003 || Kitt Peak || Spacewatch || — || align=right data-sort-value="0.82" | 820 m || 
|-id=869 bgcolor=#E9E9E9
| 359869 ||  || — || March 3, 2009 || Mount Lemmon || Mount Lemmon Survey || — || align=right | 1.4 km || 
|-id=870 bgcolor=#d6d6d6
| 359870 ||  || — || February 26, 2007 || Mount Lemmon || Mount Lemmon Survey || 7:4 || align=right | 3.8 km || 
|-id=871 bgcolor=#d6d6d6
| 359871 ||  || — || October 22, 1995 || Kitt Peak || Spacewatch || — || align=right | 2.2 km || 
|-id=872 bgcolor=#E9E9E9
| 359872 ||  || — || May 13, 2005 || Mount Lemmon || Mount Lemmon Survey || — || align=right | 1.4 km || 
|-id=873 bgcolor=#E9E9E9
| 359873 ||  || — || March 13, 2005 || Mount Lemmon || Mount Lemmon Survey || — || align=right | 1.6 km || 
|-id=874 bgcolor=#fefefe
| 359874 ||  || — || September 8, 2000 || Kitt Peak || Spacewatch || — || align=right data-sort-value="0.93" | 930 m || 
|-id=875 bgcolor=#d6d6d6
| 359875 ||  || — || November 27, 2006 || Kitt Peak || Spacewatch || — || align=right | 2.5 km || 
|-id=876 bgcolor=#d6d6d6
| 359876 ||  || — || October 28, 2005 || Kitt Peak || Spacewatch || — || align=right | 3.2 km || 
|-id=877 bgcolor=#E9E9E9
| 359877 ||  || — || November 8, 2007 || Mount Lemmon || Mount Lemmon Survey || — || align=right | 1.8 km || 
|-id=878 bgcolor=#E9E9E9
| 359878 ||  || — || August 21, 2006 || Kitt Peak || Spacewatch || — || align=right | 2.2 km || 
|-id=879 bgcolor=#d6d6d6
| 359879 ||  || — || May 28, 2009 || Mount Lemmon || Mount Lemmon Survey || — || align=right | 4.1 km || 
|-id=880 bgcolor=#d6d6d6
| 359880 ||  || — || August 27, 2005 || Kitt Peak || Spacewatch || EOS || align=right | 1.9 km || 
|-id=881 bgcolor=#fefefe
| 359881 ||  || — || March 27, 2003 || Palomar || NEAT || FLO || align=right data-sort-value="0.70" | 700 m || 
|-id=882 bgcolor=#E9E9E9
| 359882 ||  || — || October 19, 2006 || Mount Lemmon || Mount Lemmon Survey || HOF || align=right | 2.3 km || 
|-id=883 bgcolor=#d6d6d6
| 359883 ||  || — || November 25, 2000 || Socorro || LINEAR || MEL || align=right | 3.6 km || 
|-id=884 bgcolor=#d6d6d6
| 359884 ||  || — || December 15, 2006 || Kitt Peak || Spacewatch || EOS || align=right | 2.5 km || 
|-id=885 bgcolor=#E9E9E9
| 359885 ||  || — || June 13, 2005 || Mount Lemmon || Mount Lemmon Survey || AGN || align=right | 1.7 km || 
|-id=886 bgcolor=#E9E9E9
| 359886 ||  || — || April 10, 2005 || Siding Spring || SSS || — || align=right | 2.6 km || 
|-id=887 bgcolor=#d6d6d6
| 359887 ||  || — || February 13, 2008 || Kitt Peak || Spacewatch || — || align=right | 2.4 km || 
|-id=888 bgcolor=#d6d6d6
| 359888 ||  || — || September 29, 2005 || Kitt Peak || Spacewatch || — || align=right | 2.8 km || 
|-id=889 bgcolor=#d6d6d6
| 359889 ||  || — || February 27, 2008 || Mount Lemmon || Mount Lemmon Survey || — || align=right | 2.7 km || 
|-id=890 bgcolor=#d6d6d6
| 359890 ||  || — || July 31, 2005 || Palomar || NEAT || — || align=right | 3.2 km || 
|-id=891 bgcolor=#E9E9E9
| 359891 ||  || — || April 13, 1997 || Kitt Peak || Spacewatch || — || align=right | 1.4 km || 
|-id=892 bgcolor=#d6d6d6
| 359892 ||  || — || October 1, 2005 || Mount Lemmon || Mount Lemmon Survey || KOR || align=right | 1.3 km || 
|-id=893 bgcolor=#d6d6d6
| 359893 ||  || — || November 22, 2006 || Mount Lemmon || Mount Lemmon Survey || — || align=right | 3.1 km || 
|-id=894 bgcolor=#d6d6d6
| 359894 ||  || — || April 6, 2008 || Mount Lemmon || Mount Lemmon Survey || — || align=right | 2.5 km || 
|-id=895 bgcolor=#fefefe
| 359895 ||  || — || January 12, 2002 || Nyukasa || Mount Nyukasa Stn. || NYS || align=right data-sort-value="0.89" | 890 m || 
|-id=896 bgcolor=#fefefe
| 359896 ||  || — || September 13, 2007 || Catalina || CSS || V || align=right data-sort-value="0.72" | 720 m || 
|-id=897 bgcolor=#fefefe
| 359897 ||  || — || November 17, 2004 || Siding Spring || SSS || FLO || align=right data-sort-value="0.71" | 710 m || 
|-id=898 bgcolor=#E9E9E9
| 359898 ||  || — || September 15, 2006 || Kitt Peak || Spacewatch || — || align=right | 1.7 km || 
|-id=899 bgcolor=#E9E9E9
| 359899 ||  || — || December 6, 2007 || Kitt Peak || Spacewatch || — || align=right | 1.4 km || 
|-id=900 bgcolor=#fefefe
| 359900 ||  || — || October 5, 2003 || Kitt Peak || Spacewatch || — || align=right | 1.00 km || 
|}

359901–360000 

|-bgcolor=#E9E9E9
| 359901 ||  || — || December 28, 2003 || Socorro || LINEAR || — || align=right | 1.3 km || 
|-id=902 bgcolor=#d6d6d6
| 359902 ||  || — || October 24, 2005 || Kitt Peak || Spacewatch || HYG || align=right | 2.4 km || 
|-id=903 bgcolor=#fefefe
| 359903 ||  || — || August 14, 2001 || Haleakala || NEAT || — || align=right data-sort-value="0.91" | 910 m || 
|-id=904 bgcolor=#E9E9E9
| 359904 ||  || — || November 5, 2007 || Mount Lemmon || Mount Lemmon Survey || HEN || align=right | 1.1 km || 
|-id=905 bgcolor=#E9E9E9
| 359905 ||  || — || December 20, 2007 || Mount Lemmon || Mount Lemmon Survey || EUN || align=right | 1.3 km || 
|-id=906 bgcolor=#d6d6d6
| 359906 ||  || — || October 26, 2005 || Kitt Peak || Spacewatch || THM || align=right | 2.0 km || 
|-id=907 bgcolor=#E9E9E9
| 359907 ||  || — || October 12, 2007 || Kitt Peak || Spacewatch || — || align=right | 3.1 km || 
|-id=908 bgcolor=#E9E9E9
| 359908 ||  || — || December 17, 2007 || Kitt Peak || Spacewatch || — || align=right | 1.9 km || 
|-id=909 bgcolor=#d6d6d6
| 359909 ||  || — || February 9, 2007 || Catalina || CSS || — || align=right | 3.7 km || 
|-id=910 bgcolor=#d6d6d6
| 359910 ||  || — || May 14, 2005 || Mount Lemmon || Mount Lemmon Survey || — || align=right | 6.0 km || 
|-id=911 bgcolor=#d6d6d6
| 359911 ||  || — || September 2, 2010 || Mount Lemmon || Mount Lemmon Survey || EOS || align=right | 2.0 km || 
|-id=912 bgcolor=#E9E9E9
| 359912 ||  || — || February 16, 2004 || Kitt Peak || Spacewatch || — || align=right | 1.7 km || 
|-id=913 bgcolor=#d6d6d6
| 359913 ||  || — || September 30, 2005 || Mount Lemmon || Mount Lemmon Survey || THM || align=right | 2.0 km || 
|-id=914 bgcolor=#d6d6d6
| 359914 ||  || — || December 20, 2006 || Catalina || CSS || — || align=right | 3.4 km || 
|-id=915 bgcolor=#fefefe
| 359915 ||  || — || November 20, 2004 || Kitt Peak || Spacewatch || V || align=right data-sort-value="0.88" | 880 m || 
|-id=916 bgcolor=#E9E9E9
| 359916 ||  || — || December 14, 2007 || Kitt Peak || Spacewatch || — || align=right | 1.5 km || 
|-id=917 bgcolor=#d6d6d6
| 359917 ||  || — || March 26, 2008 || Mount Lemmon || Mount Lemmon Survey || — || align=right | 2.5 km || 
|-id=918 bgcolor=#E9E9E9
| 359918 ||  || — || March 19, 2009 || Kitt Peak || Spacewatch || — || align=right | 1.5 km || 
|-id=919 bgcolor=#E9E9E9
| 359919 ||  || — || August 21, 2006 || Palomar || NEAT || — || align=right | 1.9 km || 
|-id=920 bgcolor=#d6d6d6
| 359920 ||  || — || September 26, 2005 || Kitt Peak || Spacewatch || — || align=right | 2.2 km || 
|-id=921 bgcolor=#E9E9E9
| 359921 ||  || — || March 10, 2005 || Mount Lemmon || Mount Lemmon Survey || — || align=right | 1.5 km || 
|-id=922 bgcolor=#E9E9E9
| 359922 ||  || — || July 5, 2005 || Mount Lemmon || Mount Lemmon Survey || — || align=right | 3.3 km || 
|-id=923 bgcolor=#d6d6d6
| 359923 ||  || — || October 3, 2005 || Catalina || CSS || EOS || align=right | 2.6 km || 
|-id=924 bgcolor=#fefefe
| 359924 ||  || — || March 4, 2006 || Mount Lemmon || Mount Lemmon Survey || FLO || align=right data-sort-value="0.69" | 690 m || 
|-id=925 bgcolor=#E9E9E9
| 359925 ||  || — || December 18, 2007 || Mount Lemmon || Mount Lemmon Survey || — || align=right | 2.3 km || 
|-id=926 bgcolor=#d6d6d6
| 359926 ||  || — || March 30, 2008 || Kitt Peak || Spacewatch || — || align=right | 3.1 km || 
|-id=927 bgcolor=#d6d6d6
| 359927 ||  || — || August 29, 2005 || Kitt Peak || Spacewatch || — || align=right | 2.7 km || 
|-id=928 bgcolor=#d6d6d6
| 359928 ||  || — || February 11, 2002 || Socorro || LINEAR || — || align=right | 3.3 km || 
|-id=929 bgcolor=#E9E9E9
| 359929 ||  || — || December 22, 2003 || Kitt Peak || Spacewatch || — || align=right | 2.6 km || 
|-id=930 bgcolor=#d6d6d6
| 359930 ||  || — || October 13, 2010 || Mount Lemmon || Mount Lemmon Survey || VER || align=right | 3.6 km || 
|-id=931 bgcolor=#d6d6d6
| 359931 ||  || — || March 6, 2008 || Mount Lemmon || Mount Lemmon Survey || — || align=right | 2.9 km || 
|-id=932 bgcolor=#E9E9E9
| 359932 ||  || — || November 11, 2007 || Mount Lemmon || Mount Lemmon Survey || WIT || align=right | 1.1 km || 
|-id=933 bgcolor=#d6d6d6
| 359933 ||  || — || May 25, 2003 || Kitt Peak || Spacewatch || — || align=right | 4.0 km || 
|-id=934 bgcolor=#d6d6d6
| 359934 ||  || — || November 25, 2005 || Catalina || CSS || — || align=right | 3.9 km || 
|-id=935 bgcolor=#E9E9E9
| 359935 ||  || — || January 31, 2008 || Catalina || CSS || — || align=right | 2.5 km || 
|-id=936 bgcolor=#d6d6d6
| 359936 ||  || — || June 29, 2010 || WISE || WISE || LUT || align=right | 5.6 km || 
|-id=937 bgcolor=#C2FFFF
| 359937 ||  || — || December 5, 1999 || Kitt Peak || Spacewatch || L4 || align=right | 11 km || 
|-id=938 bgcolor=#E9E9E9
| 359938 ||  || — || January 31, 2008 || Mount Lemmon || Mount Lemmon Survey || — || align=right | 2.6 km || 
|-id=939 bgcolor=#C2FFFF
| 359939 ||  || — || March 4, 2000 || Kitt Peak || Spacewatch || L4 || align=right | 12 km || 
|-id=940 bgcolor=#C2FFFF
| 359940 ||  || — || April 11, 2003 || Kitt Peak || Spacewatch || L4 || align=right | 10 km || 
|-id=941 bgcolor=#d6d6d6
| 359941 ||  || — || April 25, 2003 || Kitt Peak || Spacewatch || IMH || align=right | 4.1 km || 
|-id=942 bgcolor=#d6d6d6
| 359942 ||  || — || May 5, 2003 || Kitt Peak || Spacewatch || EOS || align=right | 2.4 km || 
|-id=943 bgcolor=#C2FFFF
| 359943 ||  || — || October 13, 2009 || Bergisch Gladbac || W. Bickel || L4ERY || align=right | 8.6 km || 
|-id=944 bgcolor=#d6d6d6
| 359944 ||  || — || November 28, 2005 || Catalina || CSS || — || align=right | 3.4 km || 
|-id=945 bgcolor=#C2FFFF
| 359945 ||  || — || June 12, 2007 || Mauna Kea || D. D. Balam || L4 || align=right | 7.4 km || 
|-id=946 bgcolor=#d6d6d6
| 359946 ||  || — || April 11, 2002 || Palomar || NEAT || — || align=right | 5.0 km || 
|-id=947 bgcolor=#E9E9E9
| 359947 ||  || — || July 29, 2006 || Siding Spring || SSS || — || align=right | 1.6 km || 
|-id=948 bgcolor=#d6d6d6
| 359948 ||  || — || December 1, 2005 || Kitt Peak || Spacewatch || — || align=right | 4.2 km || 
|-id=949 bgcolor=#d6d6d6
| 359949 ||  || — || November 16, 2006 || Mount Lemmon || Mount Lemmon Survey || EOS || align=right | 2.6 km || 
|-id=950 bgcolor=#d6d6d6
| 359950 ||  || — || November 6, 1991 || Kitt Peak || Spacewatch || 628 || align=right | 2.1 km || 
|-id=951 bgcolor=#d6d6d6
| 359951 ||  || — || May 27, 2009 || Mount Lemmon || Mount Lemmon Survey || — || align=right | 4.4 km || 
|-id=952 bgcolor=#d6d6d6
| 359952 ||  || — || May 11, 2003 || Kitt Peak || Spacewatch || KOR || align=right | 1.8 km || 
|-id=953 bgcolor=#d6d6d6
| 359953 ||  || — || February 22, 2007 || Kitt Peak || Spacewatch || — || align=right | 3.1 km || 
|-id=954 bgcolor=#d6d6d6
| 359954 ||  || — || April 1, 2003 || Apache Point || SDSS || — || align=right | 3.9 km || 
|-id=955 bgcolor=#d6d6d6
| 359955 ||  || — || November 30, 2005 || Kitt Peak || Spacewatch || HYG || align=right | 3.4 km || 
|-id=956 bgcolor=#E9E9E9
| 359956 ||  || — || July 7, 2005 || Kitt Peak || Spacewatch || — || align=right | 1.8 km || 
|-id=957 bgcolor=#C2FFFF
| 359957 ||  || — || December 6, 2010 || Mount Lemmon || Mount Lemmon Survey || L4 || align=right | 8.7 km || 
|-id=958 bgcolor=#d6d6d6
| 359958 ||  || — || July 24, 2003 || Palomar || NEAT || — || align=right | 3.6 km || 
|-id=959 bgcolor=#d6d6d6
| 359959 ||  || — || June 23, 2009 || Mount Lemmon || Mount Lemmon Survey || EOS || align=right | 2.4 km || 
|-id=960 bgcolor=#C2FFFF
| 359960 ||  || — || October 12, 2009 || Mount Lemmon || Mount Lemmon Survey || L4 || align=right | 10 km || 
|-id=961 bgcolor=#C2FFFF
| 359961 ||  || — || October 9, 2008 || Mount Lemmon || Mount Lemmon Survey || L4 || align=right | 9.9 km || 
|-id=962 bgcolor=#d6d6d6
| 359962 ||  || — || October 26, 1995 || Kitt Peak || Spacewatch || — || align=right | 4.0 km || 
|-id=963 bgcolor=#C2FFFF
| 359963 ||  || — || October 26, 2009 || Kitt Peak || Spacewatch || L4 || align=right | 8.9 km || 
|-id=964 bgcolor=#d6d6d6
| 359964 ||  || — || March 11, 2007 || Anderson Mesa || LONEOS || VER || align=right | 4.0 km || 
|-id=965 bgcolor=#C2FFFF
| 359965 ||  || — || September 24, 2008 || Kitt Peak || Spacewatch || L4 || align=right | 9.5 km || 
|-id=966 bgcolor=#C2FFFF
| 359966 ||  || — || July 9, 2005 || Kitt Peak || Spacewatch || L4 || align=right | 8.3 km || 
|-id=967 bgcolor=#d6d6d6
| 359967 ||  || — || November 13, 2006 || Catalina || CSS || BRA || align=right | 2.2 km || 
|-id=968 bgcolor=#d6d6d6
| 359968 ||  || — || January 19, 2004 || Kitt Peak || Spacewatch || 3:2 || align=right | 7.3 km || 
|-id=969 bgcolor=#C2FFFF
| 359969 ||  || — || August 24, 2007 || Kitt Peak || Spacewatch || L4 || align=right | 9.3 km || 
|-id=970 bgcolor=#E9E9E9
| 359970 ||  || — || August 31, 2005 || Palomar || NEAT || WIT || align=right | 1.4 km || 
|-id=971 bgcolor=#E9E9E9
| 359971 ||  || — || July 24, 1995 || Kitt Peak || Spacewatch || — || align=right | 3.4 km || 
|-id=972 bgcolor=#d6d6d6
| 359972 ||  || — || March 13, 2002 || Kitt Peak || Spacewatch || — || align=right | 3.8 km || 
|-id=973 bgcolor=#E9E9E9
| 359973 ||  || — || September 14, 1999 || Kitt Peak || Spacewatch || — || align=right | 2.3 km || 
|-id=974 bgcolor=#C2FFFF
| 359974 ||  || — || December 28, 2011 || Mount Lemmon || Mount Lemmon Survey || L4 || align=right | 11 km || 
|-id=975 bgcolor=#C2FFFF
| 359975 ||  || — || October 26, 2009 || Kitt Peak || Spacewatch || L4 || align=right | 8.8 km || 
|-id=976 bgcolor=#E9E9E9
| 359976 ||  || — || November 9, 1999 || Socorro || LINEAR || — || align=right | 2.1 km || 
|-id=977 bgcolor=#E9E9E9
| 359977 ||  || — || April 24, 2006 || Kitt Peak || Spacewatch || — || align=right | 2.2 km || 
|-id=978 bgcolor=#d6d6d6
| 359978 ||  || — || March 1, 2009 || Mount Lemmon || Mount Lemmon Survey || HYG || align=right | 3.4 km || 
|-id=979 bgcolor=#E9E9E9
| 359979 ||  || — || September 24, 2003 || Haleakala || NEAT || — || align=right | 2.6 km || 
|-id=980 bgcolor=#d6d6d6
| 359980 ||  || — || November 7, 2007 || Kitt Peak || Spacewatch || — || align=right | 2.9 km || 
|-id=981 bgcolor=#d6d6d6
| 359981 ||  || — || February 16, 2004 || Kitt Peak || Spacewatch || — || align=right | 2.9 km || 
|-id=982 bgcolor=#d6d6d6
| 359982 ||  || — || January 17, 2007 || Palomar || NEAT || — || align=right | 4.9 km || 
|-id=983 bgcolor=#E9E9E9
| 359983 ||  || — || October 15, 2003 || Palomar || NEAT || — || align=right | 2.5 km || 
|-id=984 bgcolor=#d6d6d6
| 359984 ||  || — || October 10, 1996 || Kitt Peak || Spacewatch || — || align=right | 3.4 km || 
|-id=985 bgcolor=#fefefe
| 359985 ||  || — || April 26, 2003 || Kitt Peak || Spacewatch || NYS || align=right data-sort-value="0.79" | 790 m || 
|-id=986 bgcolor=#d6d6d6
| 359986 ||  || — || February 21, 2003 || Palomar || NEAT || HYG || align=right | 3.4 km || 
|-id=987 bgcolor=#d6d6d6
| 359987 ||  || — || August 18, 2006 || Kitt Peak || Spacewatch || — || align=right | 2.7 km || 
|-id=988 bgcolor=#E9E9E9
| 359988 ||  || — || November 20, 2003 || Socorro || LINEAR || — || align=right | 3.0 km || 
|-id=989 bgcolor=#d6d6d6
| 359989 ||  || — || January 16, 2004 || Kitt Peak || Spacewatch || CHA || align=right | 2.3 km || 
|-id=990 bgcolor=#d6d6d6
| 359990 ||  || — || November 2, 2007 || Mount Lemmon || Mount Lemmon Survey || — || align=right | 3.3 km || 
|-id=991 bgcolor=#d6d6d6
| 359991 ||  || — || October 10, 2007 || Kitt Peak || Spacewatch || KOR || align=right | 1.4 km || 
|-id=992 bgcolor=#d6d6d6
| 359992 ||  || — || September 12, 2005 || Kitt Peak || Spacewatch || HYG || align=right | 3.4 km || 
|-id=993 bgcolor=#d6d6d6
| 359993 ||  || — || April 22, 2009 || Mount Lemmon || Mount Lemmon Survey || 7:4 || align=right | 3.4 km || 
|-id=994 bgcolor=#d6d6d6
| 359994 ||  || — || May 15, 2005 || Mount Lemmon || Mount Lemmon Survey || — || align=right | 3.1 km || 
|-id=995 bgcolor=#d6d6d6
| 359995 ||  || — || August 29, 2006 || Kitt Peak || Spacewatch || — || align=right | 2.9 km || 
|-id=996 bgcolor=#d6d6d6
| 359996 ||  || — || October 6, 1996 || Kitt Peak || Spacewatch || — || align=right | 3.0 km || 
|-id=997 bgcolor=#d6d6d6
| 359997 ||  || — || January 15, 2004 || Kitt Peak || Spacewatch || — || align=right | 3.4 km || 
|-id=998 bgcolor=#d6d6d6
| 359998 ||  || — || October 10, 2001 || Palomar || NEAT || — || align=right | 4.7 km || 
|-id=999 bgcolor=#d6d6d6
| 359999 ||  || — || October 1, 1995 || Kitt Peak || Spacewatch || THM || align=right | 1.9 km || 
|-id=000 bgcolor=#d6d6d6
| 360000 ||  || — || December 18, 2001 || Socorro || LINEAR || THM || align=right | 2.4 km || 
|}

References

External links 
 Discovery Circumstances: Numbered Minor Planets (355001)–(360000) (IAU Minor Planet Center)

0359